

300001–300100 

|-bgcolor=#d6d6d6
| 300001 ||  || — || October 16, 2006 || Kitt Peak || Spacewatch || — || align=right | 2.5 km || 
|-id=002 bgcolor=#d6d6d6
| 300002 ||  || — || October 16, 2006 || Kitt Peak || Spacewatch || — || align=right | 3.3 km || 
|-id=003 bgcolor=#d6d6d6
| 300003 ||  || — || October 16, 2006 || Kitt Peak || Spacewatch || THM || align=right | 2.3 km || 
|-id=004 bgcolor=#d6d6d6
| 300004 ||  || — || October 16, 2006 || Kitt Peak || Spacewatch || — || align=right | 2.6 km || 
|-id=005 bgcolor=#d6d6d6
| 300005 ||  || — || October 16, 2006 || Kitt Peak || Spacewatch || — || align=right | 4.1 km || 
|-id=006 bgcolor=#d6d6d6
| 300006 ||  || — || October 16, 2006 || Kitt Peak || Spacewatch || — || align=right | 3.9 km || 
|-id=007 bgcolor=#d6d6d6
| 300007 ||  || — || October 17, 2006 || Kitt Peak || Spacewatch || — || align=right | 4.9 km || 
|-id=008 bgcolor=#d6d6d6
| 300008 ||  || — || October 17, 2006 || Kitt Peak || Spacewatch || — || align=right | 4.4 km || 
|-id=009 bgcolor=#d6d6d6
| 300009 ||  || — || October 17, 2006 || Mount Lemmon || Mount Lemmon Survey || — || align=right | 3.1 km || 
|-id=010 bgcolor=#d6d6d6
| 300010 ||  || — || October 17, 2006 || Mount Lemmon || Mount Lemmon Survey || EOS || align=right | 2.2 km || 
|-id=011 bgcolor=#d6d6d6
| 300011 ||  || — || October 16, 2006 || Catalina || CSS || — || align=right | 3.7 km || 
|-id=012 bgcolor=#d6d6d6
| 300012 ||  || — || September 30, 2006 || Catalina || CSS || — || align=right | 2.6 km || 
|-id=013 bgcolor=#E9E9E9
| 300013 ||  || — || October 17, 2006 || Mount Lemmon || Mount Lemmon Survey || — || align=right | 2.5 km || 
|-id=014 bgcolor=#d6d6d6
| 300014 ||  || — || October 17, 2006 || Kitt Peak || Spacewatch || — || align=right | 3.2 km || 
|-id=015 bgcolor=#d6d6d6
| 300015 ||  || — || October 17, 2006 || Kitt Peak || Spacewatch || — || align=right | 3.7 km || 
|-id=016 bgcolor=#d6d6d6
| 300016 ||  || — || October 17, 2006 || Kitt Peak || Spacewatch || HYG || align=right | 2.6 km || 
|-id=017 bgcolor=#d6d6d6
| 300017 ||  || — || October 17, 2006 || Kitt Peak || Spacewatch || EOS || align=right | 2.8 km || 
|-id=018 bgcolor=#d6d6d6
| 300018 ||  || — || October 17, 2006 || Mount Lemmon || Mount Lemmon Survey || — || align=right | 2.8 km || 
|-id=019 bgcolor=#d6d6d6
| 300019 ||  || — || October 17, 2006 || Mount Lemmon || Mount Lemmon Survey || — || align=right | 2.4 km || 
|-id=020 bgcolor=#d6d6d6
| 300020 ||  || — || October 17, 2006 || Mount Lemmon || Mount Lemmon Survey || HYG || align=right | 3.4 km || 
|-id=021 bgcolor=#d6d6d6
| 300021 ||  || — || October 17, 2006 || Mount Lemmon || Mount Lemmon Survey || HYG || align=right | 2.8 km || 
|-id=022 bgcolor=#d6d6d6
| 300022 ||  || — || October 17, 2006 || Kitt Peak || Spacewatch || — || align=right | 3.6 km || 
|-id=023 bgcolor=#d6d6d6
| 300023 ||  || — || October 17, 2006 || Kitt Peak || Spacewatch || THM || align=right | 2.5 km || 
|-id=024 bgcolor=#d6d6d6
| 300024 ||  || — || October 18, 2006 || Kitt Peak || Spacewatch || — || align=right | 2.6 km || 
|-id=025 bgcolor=#d6d6d6
| 300025 ||  || — || October 18, 2006 || Kitt Peak || Spacewatch || HYG || align=right | 2.6 km || 
|-id=026 bgcolor=#d6d6d6
| 300026 ||  || — || October 18, 2006 || Kitt Peak || Spacewatch || 637 || align=right | 2.8 km || 
|-id=027 bgcolor=#d6d6d6
| 300027 ||  || — || October 18, 2006 || Kitt Peak || Spacewatch || — || align=right | 3.4 km || 
|-id=028 bgcolor=#d6d6d6
| 300028 ||  || — || October 18, 2006 || Kitt Peak || Spacewatch || — || align=right | 3.9 km || 
|-id=029 bgcolor=#d6d6d6
| 300029 ||  || — || October 18, 2006 || Kitt Peak || Spacewatch || — || align=right | 3.4 km || 
|-id=030 bgcolor=#d6d6d6
| 300030 ||  || — || October 18, 2006 || Kitt Peak || Spacewatch || — || align=right | 3.2 km || 
|-id=031 bgcolor=#d6d6d6
| 300031 ||  || — || October 18, 2006 || Kitt Peak || Spacewatch || THM || align=right | 2.4 km || 
|-id=032 bgcolor=#d6d6d6
| 300032 ||  || — || October 18, 2006 || Kitt Peak || Spacewatch || — || align=right | 3.2 km || 
|-id=033 bgcolor=#d6d6d6
| 300033 ||  || — || October 18, 2006 || Kitt Peak || Spacewatch || EOS || align=right | 2.0 km || 
|-id=034 bgcolor=#d6d6d6
| 300034 ||  || — || October 19, 2006 || Kitt Peak || Spacewatch || — || align=right | 2.7 km || 
|-id=035 bgcolor=#d6d6d6
| 300035 ||  || — || October 19, 2006 || Kitt Peak || Spacewatch || THM || align=right | 3.6 km || 
|-id=036 bgcolor=#d6d6d6
| 300036 ||  || — || October 19, 2006 || Kitt Peak || Spacewatch || — || align=right | 2.5 km || 
|-id=037 bgcolor=#d6d6d6
| 300037 ||  || — || October 19, 2006 || Kitt Peak || Spacewatch || — || align=right | 3.8 km || 
|-id=038 bgcolor=#d6d6d6
| 300038 ||  || — || October 19, 2006 || Mount Lemmon || Mount Lemmon Survey || — || align=right | 3.8 km || 
|-id=039 bgcolor=#d6d6d6
| 300039 ||  || — || October 19, 2006 || Kitt Peak || Spacewatch || — || align=right | 2.2 km || 
|-id=040 bgcolor=#d6d6d6
| 300040 ||  || — || October 19, 2006 || Kitt Peak || Spacewatch || THM || align=right | 2.7 km || 
|-id=041 bgcolor=#d6d6d6
| 300041 ||  || — || October 19, 2006 || Kitt Peak || Spacewatch || — || align=right | 4.5 km || 
|-id=042 bgcolor=#d6d6d6
| 300042 ||  || — || October 19, 2006 || Kitt Peak || Spacewatch || — || align=right | 3.3 km || 
|-id=043 bgcolor=#d6d6d6
| 300043 ||  || — || October 19, 2006 || Mount Lemmon || Mount Lemmon Survey || EMA || align=right | 4.3 km || 
|-id=044 bgcolor=#d6d6d6
| 300044 ||  || — || October 19, 2006 || Mount Lemmon || Mount Lemmon Survey || HYG || align=right | 3.9 km || 
|-id=045 bgcolor=#d6d6d6
| 300045 ||  || — || October 19, 2006 || Mount Lemmon || Mount Lemmon Survey || — || align=right | 2.3 km || 
|-id=046 bgcolor=#d6d6d6
| 300046 ||  || — || October 19, 2006 || Kitt Peak || Spacewatch || — || align=right | 3.2 km || 
|-id=047 bgcolor=#d6d6d6
| 300047 ||  || — || October 19, 2006 || Kitt Peak || Spacewatch || — || align=right | 2.7 km || 
|-id=048 bgcolor=#d6d6d6
| 300048 ||  || — || October 19, 2006 || Mount Lemmon || Mount Lemmon Survey || — || align=right | 3.1 km || 
|-id=049 bgcolor=#d6d6d6
| 300049 ||  || — || October 19, 2006 || Kitt Peak || Spacewatch || — || align=right | 2.9 km || 
|-id=050 bgcolor=#d6d6d6
| 300050 ||  || — || October 21, 2006 || Mount Lemmon || Mount Lemmon Survey || — || align=right | 3.7 km || 
|-id=051 bgcolor=#d6d6d6
| 300051 ||  || — || October 21, 2006 || Mount Lemmon || Mount Lemmon Survey || — || align=right | 2.5 km || 
|-id=052 bgcolor=#d6d6d6
| 300052 ||  || — || October 21, 2006 || Mount Lemmon || Mount Lemmon Survey || — || align=right | 2.6 km || 
|-id=053 bgcolor=#d6d6d6
| 300053 ||  || — || October 21, 2006 || Kitt Peak || Spacewatch || EOS || align=right | 3.0 km || 
|-id=054 bgcolor=#d6d6d6
| 300054 ||  || — || October 22, 2006 || Mount Lemmon || Mount Lemmon Survey || THM || align=right | 2.4 km || 
|-id=055 bgcolor=#d6d6d6
| 300055 ||  || — || October 16, 2006 || Catalina || CSS || — || align=right | 2.8 km || 
|-id=056 bgcolor=#d6d6d6
| 300056 ||  || — || October 16, 2006 || Catalina || CSS || — || align=right | 4.7 km || 
|-id=057 bgcolor=#d6d6d6
| 300057 ||  || — || October 17, 2006 || Catalina || CSS || — || align=right | 4.9 km || 
|-id=058 bgcolor=#d6d6d6
| 300058 ||  || — || October 23, 2006 || Kitami || K. Endate || — || align=right | 4.1 km || 
|-id=059 bgcolor=#d6d6d6
| 300059 ||  || — || October 19, 2006 || Catalina || CSS || — || align=right | 3.6 km || 
|-id=060 bgcolor=#d6d6d6
| 300060 ||  || — || October 19, 2006 || Catalina || CSS || — || align=right | 2.2 km || 
|-id=061 bgcolor=#d6d6d6
| 300061 ||  || — || October 19, 2006 || Catalina || CSS || — || align=right | 3.2 km || 
|-id=062 bgcolor=#d6d6d6
| 300062 ||  || — || October 19, 2006 || Catalina || CSS || — || align=right | 4.7 km || 
|-id=063 bgcolor=#E9E9E9
| 300063 ||  || — || October 20, 2006 || Mount Lemmon || Mount Lemmon Survey || AST || align=right | 2.1 km || 
|-id=064 bgcolor=#d6d6d6
| 300064 ||  || — || October 20, 2006 || Kitt Peak || Spacewatch || THM || align=right | 2.6 km || 
|-id=065 bgcolor=#d6d6d6
| 300065 ||  || — || October 20, 2006 || Kitt Peak || Spacewatch || — || align=right | 3.6 km || 
|-id=066 bgcolor=#fefefe
| 300066 ||  || — || October 21, 2006 || Kitt Peak || Spacewatch || H || align=right data-sort-value="0.64" | 640 m || 
|-id=067 bgcolor=#d6d6d6
| 300067 ||  || — || October 21, 2006 || Kitt Peak || Spacewatch || — || align=right | 4.3 km || 
|-id=068 bgcolor=#d6d6d6
| 300068 ||  || — || October 22, 2006 || Palomar || NEAT || EOS || align=right | 2.8 km || 
|-id=069 bgcolor=#d6d6d6
| 300069 ||  || — || October 22, 2006 || Palomar || NEAT || EOS || align=right | 3.2 km || 
|-id=070 bgcolor=#d6d6d6
| 300070 ||  || — || October 23, 2006 || Kitt Peak || Spacewatch || EOS || align=right | 2.9 km || 
|-id=071 bgcolor=#d6d6d6
| 300071 ||  || — || October 23, 2006 || Kitt Peak || Spacewatch || THM || align=right | 2.5 km || 
|-id=072 bgcolor=#d6d6d6
| 300072 ||  || — || October 23, 2006 || Kitt Peak || Spacewatch || URS || align=right | 3.6 km || 
|-id=073 bgcolor=#d6d6d6
| 300073 ||  || — || October 23, 2006 || Kitt Peak || Spacewatch || — || align=right | 3.7 km || 
|-id=074 bgcolor=#d6d6d6
| 300074 ||  || — || October 23, 2006 || Palomar || NEAT || — || align=right | 5.2 km || 
|-id=075 bgcolor=#d6d6d6
| 300075 ||  || — || October 23, 2006 || Kitt Peak || Spacewatch || VER || align=right | 3.1 km || 
|-id=076 bgcolor=#d6d6d6
| 300076 ||  || — || October 23, 2006 || Kitt Peak || Spacewatch || HYG || align=right | 2.9 km || 
|-id=077 bgcolor=#d6d6d6
| 300077 ||  || — || October 23, 2006 || Kitt Peak || Spacewatch || — || align=right | 5.7 km || 
|-id=078 bgcolor=#d6d6d6
| 300078 ||  || — || October 25, 2006 || Lulin Observatory || H.-C. Lin, Q.-z. Ye || EOS || align=right | 2.9 km || 
|-id=079 bgcolor=#d6d6d6
| 300079 ||  || — || October 26, 2006 || Wildberg || R. Apitzsch || EOS || align=right | 1.6 km || 
|-id=080 bgcolor=#d6d6d6
| 300080 ||  || — || October 25, 2006 || Piszkéstető || J. Kelemen || EOS || align=right | 2.4 km || 
|-id=081 bgcolor=#d6d6d6
| 300081 ||  || — || October 29, 2006 || Desert Moon || B. L. Stevens || — || align=right | 3.1 km || 
|-id=082 bgcolor=#d6d6d6
| 300082 Moyocoanno ||  ||  || October 25, 2006 || Kuma Kogen || Y. Fujita || EOS || align=right | 2.7 km || 
|-id=083 bgcolor=#d6d6d6
| 300083 ||  || — || October 16, 2006 || Kitt Peak || Spacewatch || URS || align=right | 4.3 km || 
|-id=084 bgcolor=#d6d6d6
| 300084 ||  || — || October 17, 2006 || Catalina || CSS || THB || align=right | 4.6 km || 
|-id=085 bgcolor=#d6d6d6
| 300085 ||  || — || October 20, 2006 || Palomar || NEAT || — || align=right | 4.5 km || 
|-id=086 bgcolor=#d6d6d6
| 300086 ||  || — || October 20, 2006 || Palomar || NEAT || — || align=right | 3.0 km || 
|-id=087 bgcolor=#d6d6d6
| 300087 ||  || — || October 20, 2006 || Palomar || NEAT || — || align=right | 3.3 km || 
|-id=088 bgcolor=#d6d6d6
| 300088 ||  || — || October 21, 2006 || Mount Lemmon || Mount Lemmon Survey || — || align=right | 3.3 km || 
|-id=089 bgcolor=#d6d6d6
| 300089 ||  || — || October 21, 2006 || Palomar || NEAT || EOS || align=right | 2.7 km || 
|-id=090 bgcolor=#d6d6d6
| 300090 ||  || — || October 22, 2006 || Mount Lemmon || Mount Lemmon Survey || HYG || align=right | 3.7 km || 
|-id=091 bgcolor=#d6d6d6
| 300091 ||  || — || October 23, 2006 || Kitt Peak || Spacewatch || — || align=right | 3.3 km || 
|-id=092 bgcolor=#d6d6d6
| 300092 ||  || — || October 23, 2006 || Kitt Peak || Spacewatch || — || align=right | 3.4 km || 
|-id=093 bgcolor=#d6d6d6
| 300093 ||  || — || October 27, 2006 || Mount Lemmon || Mount Lemmon Survey || — || align=right | 2.5 km || 
|-id=094 bgcolor=#d6d6d6
| 300094 ||  || — || October 27, 2006 || Mount Lemmon || Mount Lemmon Survey || — || align=right | 4.6 km || 
|-id=095 bgcolor=#d6d6d6
| 300095 ||  || — || October 27, 2006 || Mount Lemmon || Mount Lemmon Survey || — || align=right | 2.2 km || 
|-id=096 bgcolor=#d6d6d6
| 300096 ||  || — || October 27, 2006 || Mount Lemmon || Mount Lemmon Survey || — || align=right | 3.5 km || 
|-id=097 bgcolor=#d6d6d6
| 300097 ||  || — || October 28, 2006 || Kitt Peak || Spacewatch || CHA || align=right | 2.1 km || 
|-id=098 bgcolor=#d6d6d6
| 300098 ||  || — || October 28, 2006 || Mount Lemmon || Mount Lemmon Survey || — || align=right | 3.1 km || 
|-id=099 bgcolor=#d6d6d6
| 300099 ||  || — || October 27, 2006 || Mount Lemmon || Mount Lemmon Survey || — || align=right | 3.5 km || 
|-id=100 bgcolor=#d6d6d6
| 300100 ||  || — || October 27, 2006 || Mount Lemmon || Mount Lemmon Survey || — || align=right | 2.9 km || 
|}

300101–300200 

|-bgcolor=#d6d6d6
| 300101 ||  || — || October 27, 2006 || Catalina || CSS || HYG || align=right | 3.7 km || 
|-id=102 bgcolor=#fefefe
| 300102 ||  || — || October 27, 2006 || Kitt Peak || Spacewatch || H || align=right data-sort-value="0.74" | 740 m || 
|-id=103 bgcolor=#d6d6d6
| 300103 ||  || — || October 27, 2006 || Kitt Peak || Spacewatch || EOS || align=right | 2.7 km || 
|-id=104 bgcolor=#d6d6d6
| 300104 ||  || — || October 27, 2006 || Kitt Peak || Spacewatch || — || align=right | 3.3 km || 
|-id=105 bgcolor=#d6d6d6
| 300105 ||  || — || October 28, 2006 || Mount Lemmon || Mount Lemmon Survey || THM || align=right | 2.6 km || 
|-id=106 bgcolor=#d6d6d6
| 300106 ||  || — || October 28, 2006 || Kitt Peak || Spacewatch || — || align=right | 3.5 km || 
|-id=107 bgcolor=#d6d6d6
| 300107 ||  || — || October 28, 2006 || Kitt Peak || Spacewatch || — || align=right | 4.8 km || 
|-id=108 bgcolor=#d6d6d6
| 300108 ||  || — || October 28, 2006 || Kitt Peak || Spacewatch || — || align=right | 3.3 km || 
|-id=109 bgcolor=#d6d6d6
| 300109 ||  || — || October 22, 2006 || Siding Spring || SSS || — || align=right | 3.9 km || 
|-id=110 bgcolor=#d6d6d6
| 300110 ||  || — || October 25, 2006 || Siding Spring || SSS || — || align=right | 4.4 km || 
|-id=111 bgcolor=#d6d6d6
| 300111 ||  || — || October 23, 2006 || Catalina || CSS || — || align=right | 4.3 km || 
|-id=112 bgcolor=#d6d6d6
| 300112 ||  || — || October 16, 2006 || Apache Point || A. C. Becker || — || align=right | 3.0 km || 
|-id=113 bgcolor=#d6d6d6
| 300113 ||  || — || October 21, 2006 || Apache Point || A. C. Becker || — || align=right | 2.1 km || 
|-id=114 bgcolor=#d6d6d6
| 300114 ||  || — || October 17, 2006 || Catalina || CSS || EOS || align=right | 3.0 km || 
|-id=115 bgcolor=#d6d6d6
| 300115 ||  || — || October 28, 2006 || Catalina || CSS || — || align=right | 3.3 km || 
|-id=116 bgcolor=#d6d6d6
| 300116 ||  || — || October 28, 2006 || Mount Lemmon || Mount Lemmon Survey || VER || align=right | 4.3 km || 
|-id=117 bgcolor=#d6d6d6
| 300117 ||  || — || October 22, 2006 || Catalina || CSS || — || align=right | 2.4 km || 
|-id=118 bgcolor=#d6d6d6
| 300118 ||  || — || October 21, 2006 || Mount Lemmon || Mount Lemmon Survey || — || align=right | 2.8 km || 
|-id=119 bgcolor=#d6d6d6
| 300119 ||  || — || October 27, 2006 || Catalina || CSS || — || align=right | 3.3 km || 
|-id=120 bgcolor=#d6d6d6
| 300120 ||  || — || November 3, 2006 || Antares || ARO || HYG || align=right | 3.4 km || 
|-id=121 bgcolor=#d6d6d6
| 300121 ||  || — || November 9, 2006 || Kitt Peak || Spacewatch || — || align=right | 3.9 km || 
|-id=122 bgcolor=#d6d6d6
| 300122 ||  || — || November 10, 2006 || Kitt Peak || Spacewatch || — || align=right | 4.6 km || 
|-id=123 bgcolor=#d6d6d6
| 300123 ||  || — || November 11, 2006 || Mount Lemmon || Mount Lemmon Survey || EOS || align=right | 2.8 km || 
|-id=124 bgcolor=#d6d6d6
| 300124 Alessiazecchini ||  ||  || November 14, 2006 || Vallemare di Borbona || V. S. Casulli || VER || align=right | 3.2 km || 
|-id=125 bgcolor=#d6d6d6
| 300125 ||  || — || November 9, 2006 || Kitt Peak || Spacewatch || — || align=right | 3.1 km || 
|-id=126 bgcolor=#d6d6d6
| 300126 ||  || — || November 10, 2006 || Kitt Peak || Spacewatch || CRO || align=right | 4.3 km || 
|-id=127 bgcolor=#d6d6d6
| 300127 ||  || — || November 11, 2006 || Mount Lemmon || Mount Lemmon Survey || THM || align=right | 2.9 km || 
|-id=128 bgcolor=#d6d6d6
| 300128 Panditjasraj ||  ||  || November 11, 2006 || Mount Lemmon || Mount Lemmon Survey || — || align=right | 2.6 km || 
|-id=129 bgcolor=#d6d6d6
| 300129 ||  || — || November 12, 2006 || Catalina || CSS || HYG || align=right | 2.1 km || 
|-id=130 bgcolor=#d6d6d6
| 300130 ||  || — || November 10, 2006 || Kitt Peak || Spacewatch || — || align=right | 3.2 km || 
|-id=131 bgcolor=#d6d6d6
| 300131 ||  || — || November 10, 2006 || Kitt Peak || Spacewatch || — || align=right | 4.8 km || 
|-id=132 bgcolor=#d6d6d6
| 300132 ||  || — || November 10, 2006 || Kitt Peak || Spacewatch || EUP || align=right | 4.4 km || 
|-id=133 bgcolor=#d6d6d6
| 300133 ||  || — || November 10, 2006 || Kitt Peak || Spacewatch || — || align=right | 2.7 km || 
|-id=134 bgcolor=#d6d6d6
| 300134 ||  || — || November 11, 2006 || Kitt Peak || Spacewatch || — || align=right | 4.8 km || 
|-id=135 bgcolor=#d6d6d6
| 300135 ||  || — || November 11, 2006 || Kitt Peak || Spacewatch || — || align=right | 2.8 km || 
|-id=136 bgcolor=#d6d6d6
| 300136 ||  || — || November 11, 2006 || Kitt Peak || Spacewatch || — || align=right | 3.8 km || 
|-id=137 bgcolor=#d6d6d6
| 300137 ||  || — || November 11, 2006 || Kitt Peak || Spacewatch || THM || align=right | 2.4 km || 
|-id=138 bgcolor=#d6d6d6
| 300138 ||  || — || November 11, 2006 || Kitt Peak || Spacewatch || — || align=right | 3.3 km || 
|-id=139 bgcolor=#d6d6d6
| 300139 ||  || — || November 11, 2006 || Mount Lemmon || Mount Lemmon Survey || ANF || align=right | 1.8 km || 
|-id=140 bgcolor=#d6d6d6
| 300140 ||  || — || November 11, 2006 || Kitt Peak || Spacewatch || — || align=right | 3.1 km || 
|-id=141 bgcolor=#d6d6d6
| 300141 ||  || — || November 11, 2006 || Kitt Peak || Spacewatch || THM || align=right | 2.8 km || 
|-id=142 bgcolor=#d6d6d6
| 300142 ||  || — || November 11, 2006 || Kitt Peak || Spacewatch || — || align=right | 3.9 km || 
|-id=143 bgcolor=#d6d6d6
| 300143 ||  || — || November 11, 2006 || Kitt Peak || Spacewatch || THM || align=right | 2.9 km || 
|-id=144 bgcolor=#d6d6d6
| 300144 ||  || — || November 11, 2006 || Kitt Peak || Spacewatch || THM || align=right | 2.3 km || 
|-id=145 bgcolor=#d6d6d6
| 300145 ||  || — || November 11, 2006 || Kitt Peak || Spacewatch || — || align=right | 2.9 km || 
|-id=146 bgcolor=#d6d6d6
| 300146 ||  || — || November 11, 2006 || Kitt Peak || Spacewatch || — || align=right | 3.6 km || 
|-id=147 bgcolor=#d6d6d6
| 300147 ||  || — || November 11, 2006 || Kitt Peak || Spacewatch || THM || align=right | 2.7 km || 
|-id=148 bgcolor=#d6d6d6
| 300148 ||  || — || November 11, 2006 || Mount Lemmon || Mount Lemmon Survey || — || align=right | 5.0 km || 
|-id=149 bgcolor=#d6d6d6
| 300149 ||  || — || November 12, 2006 || Mount Lemmon || Mount Lemmon Survey || THM || align=right | 2.7 km || 
|-id=150 bgcolor=#d6d6d6
| 300150 Lantan ||  ||  || November 12, 2006 || Lulin || H.-C. Lin, Q.-z. Ye || — || align=right | 3.3 km || 
|-id=151 bgcolor=#d6d6d6
| 300151 ||  || — || November 13, 2006 || Mount Lemmon || Mount Lemmon Survey || — || align=right | 4.2 km || 
|-id=152 bgcolor=#d6d6d6
| 300152 ||  || — || November 14, 2006 || Kitt Peak || Spacewatch || — || align=right | 2.5 km || 
|-id=153 bgcolor=#d6d6d6
| 300153 ||  || — || November 14, 2006 || Kitt Peak || Spacewatch || THM || align=right | 2.8 km || 
|-id=154 bgcolor=#d6d6d6
| 300154 ||  || — || November 14, 2006 || Kitt Peak || Spacewatch || — || align=right | 3.1 km || 
|-id=155 bgcolor=#d6d6d6
| 300155 ||  || — || November 15, 2006 || Kitt Peak || Spacewatch || EOS || align=right | 2.2 km || 
|-id=156 bgcolor=#d6d6d6
| 300156 ||  || — || November 10, 2006 || Kitt Peak || Spacewatch || HYG || align=right | 3.3 km || 
|-id=157 bgcolor=#d6d6d6
| 300157 ||  || — || November 10, 2006 || Kitt Peak || Spacewatch || HYG || align=right | 3.5 km || 
|-id=158 bgcolor=#d6d6d6
| 300158 ||  || — || November 11, 2006 || Kitt Peak || Spacewatch || — || align=right | 2.3 km || 
|-id=159 bgcolor=#d6d6d6
| 300159 ||  || — || November 14, 2006 || Mount Lemmon || Mount Lemmon Survey || EOS || align=right | 2.3 km || 
|-id=160 bgcolor=#d6d6d6
| 300160 ||  || — || November 15, 2006 || Kitt Peak || Spacewatch || URS || align=right | 4.5 km || 
|-id=161 bgcolor=#d6d6d6
| 300161 ||  || — || November 15, 2006 || Kitt Peak || Spacewatch || — || align=right | 4.2 km || 
|-id=162 bgcolor=#d6d6d6
| 300162 ||  || — || November 15, 2006 || Kitt Peak || Spacewatch || — || align=right | 3.9 km || 
|-id=163 bgcolor=#d6d6d6
| 300163 ||  || — || November 15, 2006 || Kitt Peak || Spacewatch || moonslow? || align=right | 3.2 km || 
|-id=164 bgcolor=#d6d6d6
| 300164 ||  || — || November 15, 2006 || Kitt Peak || Spacewatch || THM || align=right | 2.2 km || 
|-id=165 bgcolor=#d6d6d6
| 300165 ||  || — || November 15, 2006 || Kitt Peak || Spacewatch || — || align=right | 2.5 km || 
|-id=166 bgcolor=#d6d6d6
| 300166 ||  || — || November 14, 2006 || Kitt Peak || Spacewatch || HYG || align=right | 4.2 km || 
|-id=167 bgcolor=#d6d6d6
| 300167 ||  || — || November 15, 2006 || Kitt Peak || Spacewatch || HYG || align=right | 6.0 km || 
|-id=168 bgcolor=#d6d6d6
| 300168 ||  || — || November 15, 2006 || Catalina || CSS || — || align=right | 3.4 km || 
|-id=169 bgcolor=#d6d6d6
| 300169 ||  || — || November 15, 2006 || Socorro || LINEAR || — || align=right | 4.3 km || 
|-id=170 bgcolor=#d6d6d6
| 300170 ||  || — || November 9, 2006 || Palomar || NEAT || — || align=right | 4.8 km || 
|-id=171 bgcolor=#d6d6d6
| 300171 ||  || — || November 9, 2006 || Palomar || NEAT || — || align=right | 4.9 km || 
|-id=172 bgcolor=#d6d6d6
| 300172 ||  || — || November 1, 2006 || Catalina || CSS || — || align=right | 3.4 km || 
|-id=173 bgcolor=#fefefe
| 300173 ||  || — || November 17, 2006 || Socorro || LINEAR || H || align=right | 1.1 km || 
|-id=174 bgcolor=#d6d6d6
| 300174 ||  || — || November 16, 2006 || Socorro || LINEAR || ALA || align=right | 5.4 km || 
|-id=175 bgcolor=#d6d6d6
| 300175 ||  || — || November 17, 2006 || Mount Lemmon || Mount Lemmon Survey || — || align=right | 3.5 km || 
|-id=176 bgcolor=#d6d6d6
| 300176 ||  || — || November 18, 2006 || Kitt Peak || Spacewatch || — || align=right | 4.1 km || 
|-id=177 bgcolor=#d6d6d6
| 300177 ||  || — || November 16, 2006 || Kitt Peak || Spacewatch || — || align=right | 3.5 km || 
|-id=178 bgcolor=#d6d6d6
| 300178 ||  || — || November 16, 2006 || Kitt Peak || Spacewatch || — || align=right | 3.7 km || 
|-id=179 bgcolor=#d6d6d6
| 300179 ||  || — || November 16, 2006 || Kitt Peak || Spacewatch || — || align=right | 5.2 km || 
|-id=180 bgcolor=#d6d6d6
| 300180 ||  || — || November 16, 2006 || Kitt Peak || Spacewatch || — || align=right | 3.6 km || 
|-id=181 bgcolor=#d6d6d6
| 300181 ||  || — || November 16, 2006 || Mount Lemmon || Mount Lemmon Survey || VER || align=right | 2.8 km || 
|-id=182 bgcolor=#d6d6d6
| 300182 ||  || — || November 16, 2006 || Catalina || CSS || TIR || align=right | 3.8 km || 
|-id=183 bgcolor=#d6d6d6
| 300183 ||  || — || November 17, 2006 || Kitt Peak || Spacewatch || — || align=right | 4.9 km || 
|-id=184 bgcolor=#d6d6d6
| 300184 ||  || — || November 17, 2006 || Socorro || LINEAR || — || align=right | 4.3 km || 
|-id=185 bgcolor=#d6d6d6
| 300185 ||  || — || November 17, 2006 || Catalina || CSS || TIR || align=right | 2.8 km || 
|-id=186 bgcolor=#d6d6d6
| 300186 ||  || — || November 17, 2006 || Mount Lemmon || Mount Lemmon Survey || — || align=right | 4.8 km || 
|-id=187 bgcolor=#d6d6d6
| 300187 ||  || — || November 17, 2006 || Mount Lemmon || Mount Lemmon Survey || — || align=right | 3.2 km || 
|-id=188 bgcolor=#d6d6d6
| 300188 ||  || — || November 18, 2006 || Kitt Peak || Spacewatch || HYG || align=right | 3.2 km || 
|-id=189 bgcolor=#d6d6d6
| 300189 ||  || — || November 18, 2006 || Kitt Peak || Spacewatch || — || align=right | 2.5 km || 
|-id=190 bgcolor=#d6d6d6
| 300190 ||  || — || November 18, 2006 || Kitt Peak || Spacewatch || HYG || align=right | 3.9 km || 
|-id=191 bgcolor=#d6d6d6
| 300191 ||  || — || November 18, 2006 || Socorro || LINEAR || — || align=right | 3.4 km || 
|-id=192 bgcolor=#d6d6d6
| 300192 ||  || — || November 18, 2006 || Mount Lemmon || Mount Lemmon Survey || LIX || align=right | 5.4 km || 
|-id=193 bgcolor=#d6d6d6
| 300193 ||  || — || November 19, 2006 || Kitt Peak || Spacewatch || — || align=right | 3.3 km || 
|-id=194 bgcolor=#d6d6d6
| 300194 ||  || — || November 19, 2006 || Kitt Peak || Spacewatch || — || align=right | 3.7 km || 
|-id=195 bgcolor=#d6d6d6
| 300195 ||  || — || November 19, 2006 || Kitt Peak || Spacewatch || VER || align=right | 5.3 km || 
|-id=196 bgcolor=#d6d6d6
| 300196 ||  || — || November 19, 2006 || Kitt Peak || Spacewatch || THM || align=right | 2.2 km || 
|-id=197 bgcolor=#d6d6d6
| 300197 ||  || — || November 19, 2006 || Catalina || CSS || — || align=right | 3.9 km || 
|-id=198 bgcolor=#d6d6d6
| 300198 ||  || — || November 19, 2006 || Catalina || CSS || — || align=right | 2.8 km || 
|-id=199 bgcolor=#d6d6d6
| 300199 ||  || — || November 19, 2006 || Catalina || CSS || HYG || align=right | 3.4 km || 
|-id=200 bgcolor=#d6d6d6
| 300200 ||  || — || November 19, 2006 || Socorro || LINEAR || VER || align=right | 3.9 km || 
|}

300201–300300 

|-bgcolor=#d6d6d6
| 300201 ||  || — || November 19, 2006 || Socorro || LINEAR || — || align=right | 3.4 km || 
|-id=202 bgcolor=#d6d6d6
| 300202 ||  || — || November 19, 2006 || Kitt Peak || Spacewatch || THM || align=right | 2.6 km || 
|-id=203 bgcolor=#d6d6d6
| 300203 ||  || — || November 19, 2006 || Kitt Peak || Spacewatch || HYG || align=right | 3.3 km || 
|-id=204 bgcolor=#d6d6d6
| 300204 ||  || — || November 20, 2006 || Kitt Peak || Spacewatch || — || align=right | 4.1 km || 
|-id=205 bgcolor=#d6d6d6
| 300205 ||  || — || November 22, 2006 || Mount Lemmon || Mount Lemmon Survey || — || align=right | 2.4 km || 
|-id=206 bgcolor=#d6d6d6
| 300206 ||  || — || November 15, 2006 || Catalina || CSS || — || align=right | 3.0 km || 
|-id=207 bgcolor=#d6d6d6
| 300207 ||  || — || November 19, 2006 || Catalina || CSS || — || align=right | 4.2 km || 
|-id=208 bgcolor=#d6d6d6
| 300208 ||  || — || November 19, 2006 || Kitt Peak || Spacewatch || HYG || align=right | 3.3 km || 
|-id=209 bgcolor=#d6d6d6
| 300209 ||  || — || November 21, 2006 || Mount Lemmon || Mount Lemmon Survey || — || align=right | 4.5 km || 
|-id=210 bgcolor=#d6d6d6
| 300210 ||  || — || November 21, 2006 || Mount Lemmon || Mount Lemmon Survey || HYG || align=right | 2.7 km || 
|-id=211 bgcolor=#d6d6d6
| 300211 ||  || — || November 21, 2006 || Mount Lemmon || Mount Lemmon Survey || — || align=right | 3.8 km || 
|-id=212 bgcolor=#d6d6d6
| 300212 ||  || — || November 22, 2006 || Mount Lemmon || Mount Lemmon Survey || THM || align=right | 2.2 km || 
|-id=213 bgcolor=#d6d6d6
| 300213 ||  || — || November 22, 2006 || Mount Lemmon || Mount Lemmon Survey || — || align=right | 4.4 km || 
|-id=214 bgcolor=#d6d6d6
| 300214 ||  || — || November 23, 2006 || Kitt Peak || Spacewatch || THM || align=right | 2.5 km || 
|-id=215 bgcolor=#d6d6d6
| 300215 ||  || — || November 24, 2006 || Mount Lemmon || Mount Lemmon Survey || — || align=right | 3.0 km || 
|-id=216 bgcolor=#d6d6d6
| 300216 ||  || — || November 24, 2006 || Mount Lemmon || Mount Lemmon Survey || — || align=right | 2.9 km || 
|-id=217 bgcolor=#d6d6d6
| 300217 ||  || — || November 24, 2006 || Mount Lemmon || Mount Lemmon Survey || EOS || align=right | 2.7 km || 
|-id=218 bgcolor=#d6d6d6
| 300218 ||  || — || November 23, 2006 || Mount Lemmon || Mount Lemmon Survey || EOS || align=right | 2.6 km || 
|-id=219 bgcolor=#d6d6d6
| 300219 ||  || — || November 23, 2006 || Mount Lemmon || Mount Lemmon Survey || — || align=right | 4.5 km || 
|-id=220 bgcolor=#d6d6d6
| 300220 ||  || — || November 27, 2006 || Kitt Peak || Spacewatch || HYG || align=right | 3.7 km || 
|-id=221 bgcolor=#d6d6d6
| 300221 Brucebills ||  ||  || December 10, 2006 || CBA-NOVAC || D. R. Skillman || — || align=right | 3.9 km || 
|-id=222 bgcolor=#d6d6d6
| 300222 ||  || — || December 8, 2006 || Palomar || NEAT || — || align=right | 5.0 km || 
|-id=223 bgcolor=#d6d6d6
| 300223 ||  || — || December 9, 2006 || Kitt Peak || Spacewatch || — || align=right | 2.9 km || 
|-id=224 bgcolor=#d6d6d6
| 300224 ||  || — || December 12, 2006 || Catalina || CSS || VER || align=right | 4.2 km || 
|-id=225 bgcolor=#d6d6d6
| 300225 ||  || — || December 13, 2006 || Kitt Peak || Spacewatch || — || align=right | 4.4 km || 
|-id=226 bgcolor=#d6d6d6
| 300226 Francocanepari ||  ||  || December 13, 2006 || San Marcello || L. Tesi, G. Fagioli || — || align=right | 6.2 km || 
|-id=227 bgcolor=#d6d6d6
| 300227 ||  || — || December 14, 2006 || Socorro || LINEAR || — || align=right | 5.1 km || 
|-id=228 bgcolor=#d6d6d6
| 300228 ||  || — || December 15, 2006 || Socorro || LINEAR || — || align=right | 3.1 km || 
|-id=229 bgcolor=#d6d6d6
| 300229 ||  || — || December 15, 2006 || Kitt Peak || Spacewatch || — || align=right | 3.1 km || 
|-id=230 bgcolor=#d6d6d6
| 300230 ||  || — || December 16, 2006 || Kitt Peak || Spacewatch || — || align=right | 4.7 km || 
|-id=231 bgcolor=#d6d6d6
| 300231 ||  || — || December 16, 2006 || Mount Lemmon || Mount Lemmon Survey || HYG || align=right | 2.8 km || 
|-id=232 bgcolor=#d6d6d6
| 300232 ||  || — || December 17, 2006 || Mount Lemmon || Mount Lemmon Survey || HYG || align=right | 3.4 km || 
|-id=233 bgcolor=#d6d6d6
| 300233 ||  || — || December 20, 2006 || Palomar || NEAT || LIX || align=right | 5.4 km || 
|-id=234 bgcolor=#d6d6d6
| 300234 ||  || — || December 21, 2006 || Mount Lemmon || Mount Lemmon Survey || — || align=right | 2.5 km || 
|-id=235 bgcolor=#d6d6d6
| 300235 ||  || — || December 22, 2006 || Mount Lemmon || Mount Lemmon Survey || — || align=right | 5.2 km || 
|-id=236 bgcolor=#d6d6d6
| 300236 ||  || — || December 22, 2006 || Kitt Peak || Spacewatch || LIX || align=right | 4.9 km || 
|-id=237 bgcolor=#d6d6d6
| 300237 ||  || — || December 20, 2006 || Palomar || NEAT || MEL || align=right | 6.1 km || 
|-id=238 bgcolor=#d6d6d6
| 300238 ||  || — || February 7, 2007 || Mount Lemmon || Mount Lemmon Survey || — || align=right | 3.0 km || 
|-id=239 bgcolor=#fefefe
| 300239 ||  || — || February 8, 2007 || Mount Lemmon || Mount Lemmon Survey || H || align=right data-sort-value="0.73" | 730 m || 
|-id=240 bgcolor=#fefefe
| 300240 ||  || — || February 9, 2007 || Marly || P. Kocher || H || align=right data-sort-value="0.86" | 860 m || 
|-id=241 bgcolor=#fefefe
| 300241 ||  || — || February 10, 2007 || Catalina || CSS || H || align=right data-sort-value="0.83" | 830 m || 
|-id=242 bgcolor=#C2FFFF
| 300242 ||  || — || February 21, 2007 || Kitt Peak || Spacewatch || L5 || align=right | 7.7 km || 
|-id=243 bgcolor=#fefefe
| 300243 ||  || — || February 21, 2007 || Catalina || CSS || H || align=right data-sort-value="0.66" | 660 m || 
|-id=244 bgcolor=#C2FFFF
| 300244 ||  || — || March 9, 2007 || Mount Lemmon || Mount Lemmon Survey || L5 || align=right | 9.1 km || 
|-id=245 bgcolor=#fefefe
| 300245 ||  || — || March 10, 2007 || Mount Lemmon || Mount Lemmon Survey || FLO || align=right data-sort-value="0.52" | 520 m || 
|-id=246 bgcolor=#fefefe
| 300246 ||  || — || March 10, 2007 || Mount Lemmon || Mount Lemmon Survey || — || align=right data-sort-value="0.66" | 660 m || 
|-id=247 bgcolor=#fefefe
| 300247 ||  || — || March 11, 2007 || Kitt Peak || Spacewatch || FLO || align=right data-sort-value="0.58" | 580 m || 
|-id=248 bgcolor=#fefefe
| 300248 ||  || — || March 15, 2007 || Socorro || LINEAR || — || align=right data-sort-value="0.79" | 790 m || 
|-id=249 bgcolor=#C2FFFF
| 300249 ||  || — || March 9, 2007 || Mount Lemmon || Mount Lemmon Survey || L5 || align=right | 8.6 km || 
|-id=250 bgcolor=#C2FFFF
| 300250 ||  || — || March 10, 2007 || Mount Lemmon || Mount Lemmon Survey || L5 || align=right | 14 km || 
|-id=251 bgcolor=#fefefe
| 300251 ||  || — || March 20, 2007 || Kitt Peak || Spacewatch || — || align=right data-sort-value="0.52" | 520 m || 
|-id=252 bgcolor=#fefefe
| 300252 ||  || — || March 20, 2007 || Kitt Peak || Spacewatch || FLO || align=right data-sort-value="0.64" | 640 m || 
|-id=253 bgcolor=#fefefe
| 300253 ||  || — || April 7, 2007 || Mount Lemmon || Mount Lemmon Survey || — || align=right data-sort-value="0.64" | 640 m || 
|-id=254 bgcolor=#fefefe
| 300254 ||  || — || April 14, 2007 || Kitt Peak || Spacewatch || — || align=right data-sort-value="0.60" | 600 m || 
|-id=255 bgcolor=#fefefe
| 300255 ||  || — || April 14, 2007 || Mount Lemmon || Mount Lemmon Survey || — || align=right data-sort-value="0.67" | 670 m || 
|-id=256 bgcolor=#fefefe
| 300256 ||  || — || April 15, 2007 || Kitt Peak || Spacewatch || — || align=right data-sort-value="0.81" | 810 m || 
|-id=257 bgcolor=#fefefe
| 300257 ||  || — || April 15, 2007 || Kitt Peak || Spacewatch || — || align=right data-sort-value="0.85" | 850 m || 
|-id=258 bgcolor=#fefefe
| 300258 ||  || — || April 18, 2007 || Pises || Pises Obs. || — || align=right data-sort-value="0.79" | 790 m || 
|-id=259 bgcolor=#fefefe
| 300259 ||  || — || April 23, 2007 || Tiki || S. F. Hönig, N. Teamo || — || align=right data-sort-value="0.78" | 780 m || 
|-id=260 bgcolor=#fefefe
| 300260 ||  || — || April 18, 2007 || Kitt Peak || Spacewatch || — || align=right data-sort-value="0.80" | 800 m || 
|-id=261 bgcolor=#fefefe
| 300261 ||  || — || April 18, 2007 || Mount Lemmon || Mount Lemmon Survey || NYS || align=right data-sort-value="0.77" | 770 m || 
|-id=262 bgcolor=#fefefe
| 300262 ||  || — || April 19, 2007 || Kitt Peak || Spacewatch || FLO || align=right data-sort-value="0.54" | 540 m || 
|-id=263 bgcolor=#fefefe
| 300263 ||  || — || April 19, 2007 || Kitt Peak || Spacewatch || FLO || align=right data-sort-value="0.65" | 650 m || 
|-id=264 bgcolor=#fefefe
| 300264 ||  || — || April 19, 2007 || Mount Lemmon || Mount Lemmon Survey || — || align=right | 1.2 km || 
|-id=265 bgcolor=#fefefe
| 300265 ||  || — || April 25, 2007 || Mount Lemmon || Mount Lemmon Survey || — || align=right data-sort-value="0.74" | 740 m || 
|-id=266 bgcolor=#fefefe
| 300266 ||  || — || April 22, 2007 || Kitt Peak || Spacewatch || — || align=right data-sort-value="0.79" | 790 m || 
|-id=267 bgcolor=#fefefe
| 300267 ||  || — || May 7, 2007 || Lulin Observatory || LUSS || — || align=right data-sort-value="0.77" | 770 m || 
|-id=268 bgcolor=#fefefe
| 300268 ||  || — || May 9, 2007 || Mount Lemmon || Mount Lemmon Survey || — || align=right data-sort-value="0.93" | 930 m || 
|-id=269 bgcolor=#fefefe
| 300269 ||  || — || May 7, 2007 || Kitt Peak || Spacewatch || — || align=right | 1.1 km || 
|-id=270 bgcolor=#fefefe
| 300270 ||  || — || May 7, 2007 || Kitt Peak || Spacewatch || V || align=right data-sort-value="0.68" | 680 m || 
|-id=271 bgcolor=#fefefe
| 300271 ||  || — || May 9, 2007 || Kitt Peak || Spacewatch || — || align=right data-sort-value="0.86" | 860 m || 
|-id=272 bgcolor=#fefefe
| 300272 ||  || — || May 10, 2007 || Kitt Peak || Spacewatch || — || align=right data-sort-value="0.79" | 790 m || 
|-id=273 bgcolor=#fefefe
| 300273 ||  || — || May 12, 2007 || Kitt Peak || Spacewatch || — || align=right data-sort-value="0.92" | 920 m || 
|-id=274 bgcolor=#fefefe
| 300274 ||  || — || May 11, 2007 || Mount Lemmon || Mount Lemmon Survey || — || align=right data-sort-value="0.95" | 950 m || 
|-id=275 bgcolor=#fefefe
| 300275 ||  || — || May 25, 2007 || Mount Lemmon || Mount Lemmon Survey || — || align=right data-sort-value="0.65" | 650 m || 
|-id=276 bgcolor=#fefefe
| 300276 ||  || — || May 19, 2007 || Catalina || CSS || — || align=right | 1.1 km || 
|-id=277 bgcolor=#fefefe
| 300277 ||  || — || June 8, 2007 || Kitt Peak || Spacewatch || PHO || align=right data-sort-value="0.90" | 900 m || 
|-id=278 bgcolor=#fefefe
| 300278 ||  || — || June 12, 2007 || Kitt Peak || Spacewatch || FLO || align=right data-sort-value="0.67" | 670 m || 
|-id=279 bgcolor=#fefefe
| 300279 ||  || — || June 15, 2007 || Kitt Peak || Spacewatch || V || align=right data-sort-value="0.94" | 940 m || 
|-id=280 bgcolor=#fefefe
| 300280 ||  || — || June 16, 2007 || Kitt Peak || Spacewatch || V || align=right data-sort-value="0.90" | 900 m || 
|-id=281 bgcolor=#FA8072
| 300281 ||  || — || June 17, 2007 || Kitt Peak || Spacewatch || — || align=right | 1.2 km || 
|-id=282 bgcolor=#fefefe
| 300282 ||  || — || June 21, 2007 || Mount Lemmon || Mount Lemmon Survey || V || align=right | 1.00 km || 
|-id=283 bgcolor=#fefefe
| 300283 ||  || — || June 22, 2007 || Kitt Peak || Spacewatch || MAS || align=right data-sort-value="0.81" | 810 m || 
|-id=284 bgcolor=#fefefe
| 300284 ||  || — || July 14, 2007 || Tiki || S. F. Hönig, N. Teamo || — || align=right data-sort-value="0.94" | 940 m || 
|-id=285 bgcolor=#fefefe
| 300285 ||  || — || July 20, 2007 || La Sagra || OAM Obs. || — || align=right | 2.0 km || 
|-id=286 bgcolor=#fefefe
| 300286 Zintun ||  ||  || July 21, 2007 || Lulin || H.-C. Lin, Q.-z. Ye || — || align=right | 1.3 km || 
|-id=287 bgcolor=#fefefe
| 300287 ||  || — || March 4, 2006 || Kitt Peak || Spacewatch || V || align=right | 1.2 km || 
|-id=288 bgcolor=#fefefe
| 300288 ||  || — || July 22, 2007 || Lulin || LUSS || — || align=right | 1.1 km || 
|-id=289 bgcolor=#fefefe
| 300289 ||  || — || July 18, 2007 || Mount Lemmon || Mount Lemmon Survey || CLA || align=right | 2.0 km || 
|-id=290 bgcolor=#E9E9E9
| 300290 ||  || — || August 5, 2007 || Pla D'Arguines || R. Ferrando || — || align=right | 1.3 km || 
|-id=291 bgcolor=#fefefe
| 300291 ||  || — || August 6, 2007 || Lulin || LUSS || NYS || align=right data-sort-value="0.91" | 910 m || 
|-id=292 bgcolor=#fefefe
| 300292 ||  || — || August 6, 2007 || Reedy Creek || J. Broughton || V || align=right data-sort-value="0.97" | 970 m || 
|-id=293 bgcolor=#fefefe
| 300293 ||  || — || August 7, 2007 || Reedy Creek || J. Broughton || — || align=right | 3.1 km || 
|-id=294 bgcolor=#E9E9E9
| 300294 ||  || — || August 10, 2007 || Siding Spring || SSS || PAL || align=right | 3.7 km || 
|-id=295 bgcolor=#fefefe
| 300295 ||  || — || August 6, 2007 || Dauban || Chante-Perdrix Obs. || — || align=right | 1.0 km || 
|-id=296 bgcolor=#fefefe
| 300296 ||  || — || August 8, 2007 || Socorro || LINEAR || NYS || align=right data-sort-value="0.98" | 980 m || 
|-id=297 bgcolor=#fefefe
| 300297 ||  || — || August 9, 2007 || Socorro || LINEAR || V || align=right | 1.0 km || 
|-id=298 bgcolor=#fefefe
| 300298 ||  || — || August 8, 2007 || Socorro || LINEAR || NYS || align=right | 2.1 km || 
|-id=299 bgcolor=#fefefe
| 300299 ||  || — || August 11, 2007 || Socorro || LINEAR || — || align=right | 1.4 km || 
|-id=300 bgcolor=#fefefe
| 300300 TAM ||  ||  || August 6, 2007 || Lulin || H.-C. Lin, Q.-z. Ye || MAS || align=right data-sort-value="0.99" | 990 m || 
|}

300301–300400 

|-bgcolor=#fefefe
| 300301 ||  || — || August 8, 2007 || Socorro || LINEAR || MAS || align=right | 1.2 km || 
|-id=302 bgcolor=#fefefe
| 300302 ||  || — || August 8, 2007 || Socorro || LINEAR || NYS || align=right data-sort-value="0.91" | 910 m || 
|-id=303 bgcolor=#fefefe
| 300303 ||  || — || August 9, 2007 || Socorro || LINEAR || — || align=right | 1.2 km || 
|-id=304 bgcolor=#fefefe
| 300304 ||  || — || August 9, 2007 || Socorro || LINEAR || — || align=right | 1.2 km || 
|-id=305 bgcolor=#fefefe
| 300305 ||  || — || August 9, 2007 || Socorro || LINEAR || — || align=right data-sort-value="0.98" | 980 m || 
|-id=306 bgcolor=#fefefe
| 300306 ||  || — || August 9, 2007 || Socorro || LINEAR || NYS || align=right data-sort-value="0.86" | 860 m || 
|-id=307 bgcolor=#fefefe
| 300307 ||  || — || August 9, 2007 || Socorro || LINEAR || V || align=right | 1.2 km || 
|-id=308 bgcolor=#fefefe
| 300308 ||  || — || August 11, 2007 || Socorro || LINEAR || — || align=right | 1.3 km || 
|-id=309 bgcolor=#fefefe
| 300309 ||  || — || August 12, 2007 || Socorro || LINEAR || V || align=right data-sort-value="0.90" | 900 m || 
|-id=310 bgcolor=#fefefe
| 300310 ||  || — || August 11, 2007 || Siding Spring || SSS || — || align=right | 1.5 km || 
|-id=311 bgcolor=#fefefe
| 300311 ||  || — || August 9, 2007 || Palomar || Palomar Obs. || V || align=right data-sort-value="0.69" | 690 m || 
|-id=312 bgcolor=#fefefe
| 300312 ||  || — || August 15, 2007 || Altschwendt || W. Ries || — || align=right | 1.3 km || 
|-id=313 bgcolor=#fefefe
| 300313 ||  || — || August 5, 2007 || Socorro || LINEAR || — || align=right | 3.6 km || 
|-id=314 bgcolor=#fefefe
| 300314 ||  || — || August 8, 2007 || Socorro || LINEAR || MAS || align=right | 1.0 km || 
|-id=315 bgcolor=#fefefe
| 300315 ||  || — || August 9, 2007 || Socorro || LINEAR || MAS || align=right | 1.0 km || 
|-id=316 bgcolor=#fefefe
| 300316 ||  || — || August 12, 2007 || Socorro || LINEAR || V || align=right data-sort-value="0.80" | 800 m || 
|-id=317 bgcolor=#fefefe
| 300317 ||  || — || August 13, 2007 || Socorro || LINEAR || ERI || align=right | 2.8 km || 
|-id=318 bgcolor=#fefefe
| 300318 ||  || — || August 11, 2007 || Anderson Mesa || LONEOS || — || align=right | 1.2 km || 
|-id=319 bgcolor=#fefefe
| 300319 ||  || — || August 10, 2007 || Kitt Peak || Spacewatch || — || align=right | 1.0 km || 
|-id=320 bgcolor=#fefefe
| 300320 ||  || — || August 10, 2007 || Kitt Peak || Spacewatch || — || align=right | 2.2 km || 
|-id=321 bgcolor=#fefefe
| 300321 ||  || — || August 15, 2007 || Socorro || LINEAR || NYS || align=right data-sort-value="0.72" | 720 m || 
|-id=322 bgcolor=#fefefe
| 300322 ||  || — || August 16, 2007 || Socorro || LINEAR || — || align=right | 1.1 km || 
|-id=323 bgcolor=#fefefe
| 300323 ||  || — || August 21, 2007 || Goodricke-Pigott || R. A. Tucker || — || align=right | 1.7 km || 
|-id=324 bgcolor=#fefefe
| 300324 ||  || — || August 21, 2007 || Hibiscus || S. F. Hönig, N. Teamo || — || align=right | 1.4 km || 
|-id=325 bgcolor=#fefefe
| 300325 ||  || — || August 26, 2007 || Suno || Suno Obs. || — || align=right | 1.4 km || 
|-id=326 bgcolor=#fefefe
| 300326 ||  || — || August 21, 2007 || Anderson Mesa || LONEOS || — || align=right | 1.2 km || 
|-id=327 bgcolor=#fefefe
| 300327 ||  || — || August 21, 2007 || Anderson Mesa || LONEOS || NYS || align=right data-sort-value="0.91" | 910 m || 
|-id=328 bgcolor=#fefefe
| 300328 ||  || — || August 21, 2007 || Anderson Mesa || LONEOS || NYS || align=right data-sort-value="0.91" | 910 m || 
|-id=329 bgcolor=#E9E9E9
| 300329 ||  || — || August 22, 2007 || Socorro || LINEAR || — || align=right data-sort-value="0.86" | 860 m || 
|-id=330 bgcolor=#fefefe
| 300330 ||  || — || September 6, 2007 || Dauban || Chante-Perdrix Obs. || — || align=right | 1.1 km || 
|-id=331 bgcolor=#fefefe
| 300331 ||  || — || September 3, 2007 || Catalina || CSS || — || align=right data-sort-value="0.92" | 920 m || 
|-id=332 bgcolor=#E9E9E9
| 300332 ||  || — || September 9, 2007 || Marly || P. Kocher || — || align=right | 1.1 km || 
|-id=333 bgcolor=#E9E9E9
| 300333 ||  || — || September 12, 2007 || Dauban || Chante-Perdrix Obs. || MAR || align=right | 1.4 km || 
|-id=334 bgcolor=#fefefe
| 300334 Antonalexander ||  ||  || September 12, 2007 || Rimbach || M. König || — || align=right | 1.5 km || 
|-id=335 bgcolor=#fefefe
| 300335 ||  || — || September 2, 2007 || Catalina || CSS || — || align=right | 1.2 km || 
|-id=336 bgcolor=#fefefe
| 300336 ||  || — || September 3, 2007 || Catalina || CSS || V || align=right data-sort-value="0.99" | 990 m || 
|-id=337 bgcolor=#fefefe
| 300337 ||  || — || September 4, 2007 || Catalina || CSS || — || align=right | 1.5 km || 
|-id=338 bgcolor=#fefefe
| 300338 ||  || — || September 5, 2007 || Catalina || CSS || — || align=right | 1.5 km || 
|-id=339 bgcolor=#fefefe
| 300339 ||  || — || September 5, 2007 || Catalina || CSS || — || align=right | 1.8 km || 
|-id=340 bgcolor=#fefefe
| 300340 ||  || — || September 5, 2007 || Catalina || CSS || LCI || align=right | 1.5 km || 
|-id=341 bgcolor=#fefefe
| 300341 ||  || — || September 6, 2007 || Anderson Mesa || LONEOS || NYS || align=right data-sort-value="0.91" | 910 m || 
|-id=342 bgcolor=#E9E9E9
| 300342 ||  || — || September 8, 2007 || Anderson Mesa || LONEOS || — || align=right | 1.6 km || 
|-id=343 bgcolor=#fefefe
| 300343 ||  || — || September 9, 2007 || Anderson Mesa || LONEOS || V || align=right data-sort-value="0.91" | 910 m || 
|-id=344 bgcolor=#E9E9E9
| 300344 ||  || — || September 9, 2007 || Kitt Peak || Spacewatch || — || align=right | 1.2 km || 
|-id=345 bgcolor=#fefefe
| 300345 ||  || — || September 9, 2007 || Kitt Peak || Spacewatch || — || align=right | 1.4 km || 
|-id=346 bgcolor=#E9E9E9
| 300346 ||  || — || September 9, 2007 || Mount Lemmon || Mount Lemmon Survey || — || align=right data-sort-value="0.78" | 780 m || 
|-id=347 bgcolor=#E9E9E9
| 300347 ||  || — || September 9, 2007 || Mount Lemmon || Mount Lemmon Survey || — || align=right | 1.4 km || 
|-id=348 bgcolor=#E9E9E9
| 300348 ||  || — || September 9, 2007 || Mount Lemmon || Mount Lemmon Survey || — || align=right | 1.8 km || 
|-id=349 bgcolor=#E9E9E9
| 300349 ||  || — || September 9, 2007 || Kitt Peak || Spacewatch || — || align=right | 1.8 km || 
|-id=350 bgcolor=#E9E9E9
| 300350 ||  || — || September 9, 2007 || Kitt Peak || Spacewatch || MAR || align=right | 1.1 km || 
|-id=351 bgcolor=#E9E9E9
| 300351 ||  || — || September 9, 2007 || Kitt Peak || Spacewatch || KONcritical || align=right | 2.4 km || 
|-id=352 bgcolor=#E9E9E9
| 300352 ||  || — || September 30, 2003 || Kitt Peak || Spacewatch || — || align=right data-sort-value="0.98" | 980 m || 
|-id=353 bgcolor=#E9E9E9
| 300353 ||  || — || September 9, 2007 || Kitt Peak || Spacewatch || — || align=right | 1.9 km || 
|-id=354 bgcolor=#E9E9E9
| 300354 ||  || — || September 9, 2007 || Mount Lemmon || Mount Lemmon Survey || — || align=right | 1.4 km || 
|-id=355 bgcolor=#fefefe
| 300355 ||  || — || September 10, 2007 || Mount Lemmon || Mount Lemmon Survey || MAS || align=right data-sort-value="0.78" | 780 m || 
|-id=356 bgcolor=#fefefe
| 300356 ||  || — || September 10, 2007 || Kitt Peak || Spacewatch || MAS || align=right data-sort-value="0.98" | 980 m || 
|-id=357 bgcolor=#fefefe
| 300357 ||  || — || September 10, 2007 || Kitt Peak || Spacewatch || MAS || align=right data-sort-value="0.98" | 980 m || 
|-id=358 bgcolor=#fefefe
| 300358 ||  || — || September 10, 2007 || Mount Lemmon || Mount Lemmon Survey || MAS || align=right data-sort-value="0.79" | 790 m || 
|-id=359 bgcolor=#fefefe
| 300359 ||  || — || September 10, 2007 || Mount Lemmon || Mount Lemmon Survey || — || align=right data-sort-value="0.93" | 930 m || 
|-id=360 bgcolor=#fefefe
| 300360 ||  || — || September 10, 2007 || Mount Lemmon || Mount Lemmon Survey || — || align=right | 1.1 km || 
|-id=361 bgcolor=#fefefe
| 300361 ||  || — || September 10, 2007 || Mount Lemmon || Mount Lemmon Survey || MAS || align=right data-sort-value="0.98" | 980 m || 
|-id=362 bgcolor=#E9E9E9
| 300362 ||  || — || September 10, 2007 || Mount Lemmon || Mount Lemmon Survey || — || align=right | 1.5 km || 
|-id=363 bgcolor=#E9E9E9
| 300363 ||  || — || September 10, 2007 || Mount Lemmon || Mount Lemmon Survey || EUN || align=right | 1.3 km || 
|-id=364 bgcolor=#E9E9E9
| 300364 ||  || — || September 10, 2007 || Mount Lemmon || Mount Lemmon Survey || — || align=right | 1.2 km || 
|-id=365 bgcolor=#fefefe
| 300365 ||  || — || September 11, 2007 || Catalina || CSS || — || align=right | 1.3 km || 
|-id=366 bgcolor=#fefefe
| 300366 ||  || — || September 11, 2007 || Kitt Peak || Spacewatch || NYScritical || align=right data-sort-value="0.76" | 760 m || 
|-id=367 bgcolor=#fefefe
| 300367 ||  || — || September 11, 2007 || Kitt Peak || Spacewatch || NYS || align=right data-sort-value="0.73" | 730 m || 
|-id=368 bgcolor=#fefefe
| 300368 ||  || — || September 12, 2007 || Catalina || CSS || — || align=right | 1.8 km || 
|-id=369 bgcolor=#fefefe
| 300369 ||  || — || September 12, 2007 || Mount Lemmon || Mount Lemmon Survey || MAS || align=right data-sort-value="0.76" | 760 m || 
|-id=370 bgcolor=#fefefe
| 300370 ||  || — || September 12, 2007 || Mount Lemmon || Mount Lemmon Survey || — || align=right | 1.0 km || 
|-id=371 bgcolor=#E9E9E9
| 300371 ||  || — || September 12, 2007 || Mount Lemmon || Mount Lemmon Survey || — || align=right data-sort-value="0.94" | 940 m || 
|-id=372 bgcolor=#E9E9E9
| 300372 ||  || — || September 12, 2007 || Anderson Mesa || LONEOS || — || align=right data-sort-value="0.96" | 960 m || 
|-id=373 bgcolor=#fefefe
| 300373 ||  || — || September 13, 2007 || Socorro || LINEAR || — || align=right | 1.1 km || 
|-id=374 bgcolor=#E9E9E9
| 300374 ||  || — || September 13, 2007 || Socorro || LINEAR || — || align=right data-sort-value="0.96" | 960 m || 
|-id=375 bgcolor=#E9E9E9
| 300375 ||  || — || September 13, 2007 || Socorro || LINEAR || — || align=right | 1.8 km || 
|-id=376 bgcolor=#E9E9E9
| 300376 ||  || — || September 14, 2007 || Socorro || LINEAR || — || align=right | 2.7 km || 
|-id=377 bgcolor=#E9E9E9
| 300377 ||  || — || September 14, 2007 || Socorro || LINEAR || MAR || align=right | 1.5 km || 
|-id=378 bgcolor=#fefefe
| 300378 ||  || — || September 15, 2007 || Socorro || LINEAR || — || align=right | 1.6 km || 
|-id=379 bgcolor=#fefefe
| 300379 ||  || — || September 12, 2007 || Catalina || CSS || V || align=right | 1.1 km || 
|-id=380 bgcolor=#E9E9E9
| 300380 ||  || — || September 15, 2007 || Mount Lemmon || Mount Lemmon Survey || — || align=right | 2.8 km || 
|-id=381 bgcolor=#fefefe
| 300381 ||  || — || September 9, 2007 || Anderson Mesa || LONEOS || — || align=right | 1.1 km || 
|-id=382 bgcolor=#fefefe
| 300382 ||  || — || September 10, 2007 || Mount Lemmon || Mount Lemmon Survey || MAS || align=right data-sort-value="0.78" | 780 m || 
|-id=383 bgcolor=#fefefe
| 300383 ||  || — || September 12, 2007 || Catalina || CSS || NYS || align=right data-sort-value="0.83" | 830 m || 
|-id=384 bgcolor=#fefefe
| 300384 ||  || — || September 12, 2007 || Catalina || CSS || V || align=right data-sort-value="0.83" | 830 m || 
|-id=385 bgcolor=#fefefe
| 300385 ||  || — || September 10, 2007 || Kitt Peak || Spacewatch || — || align=right data-sort-value="0.94" | 940 m || 
|-id=386 bgcolor=#fefefe
| 300386 ||  || — || September 10, 2007 || Kitt Peak || Spacewatch || — || align=right | 1.1 km || 
|-id=387 bgcolor=#fefefe
| 300387 ||  || — || September 13, 2007 || Catalina || CSS || LCI || align=right | 2.2 km || 
|-id=388 bgcolor=#fefefe
| 300388 ||  || — || September 13, 2007 || Mount Lemmon || Mount Lemmon Survey || — || align=right data-sort-value="0.80" | 800 m || 
|-id=389 bgcolor=#E9E9E9
| 300389 ||  || — || September 13, 2007 || Kitt Peak || Spacewatch || KON || align=right | 2.0 km || 
|-id=390 bgcolor=#fefefe
| 300390 ||  || — || September 10, 2007 || Kitt Peak || Spacewatch || NYS || align=right data-sort-value="0.67" | 670 m || 
|-id=391 bgcolor=#E9E9E9
| 300391 ||  || — || September 12, 2007 || Kitt Peak || Spacewatch || RAF || align=right | 1.1 km || 
|-id=392 bgcolor=#E9E9E9
| 300392 ||  || — || September 13, 2007 || Mount Lemmon || Mount Lemmon Survey || — || align=right | 1.6 km || 
|-id=393 bgcolor=#E9E9E9
| 300393 ||  || — || September 14, 2007 || Mount Lemmon || Mount Lemmon Survey || — || align=right | 2.0 km || 
|-id=394 bgcolor=#E9E9E9
| 300394 ||  || — || September 10, 2007 || Kitt Peak || Spacewatch || HEN || align=right | 1.2 km || 
|-id=395 bgcolor=#E9E9E9
| 300395 ||  || — || September 11, 2007 || Mount Lemmon || Mount Lemmon Survey || ADE || align=right | 1.8 km || 
|-id=396 bgcolor=#E9E9E9
| 300396 ||  || — || September 14, 2007 || Mount Lemmon || Mount Lemmon Survey || — || align=right | 1.0 km || 
|-id=397 bgcolor=#E9E9E9
| 300397 ||  || — || September 13, 2007 || Socorro || LINEAR || EUN || align=right | 1.7 km || 
|-id=398 bgcolor=#E9E9E9
| 300398 ||  || — || September 13, 2007 || Mount Lemmon || Mount Lemmon Survey || — || align=right | 1.9 km || 
|-id=399 bgcolor=#fefefe
| 300399 ||  || — || September 14, 2007 || Kitt Peak || Spacewatch || V || align=right data-sort-value="0.95" | 950 m || 
|-id=400 bgcolor=#E9E9E9
| 300400 ||  || — || September 14, 2007 || Mount Lemmon || Mount Lemmon Survey || — || align=right | 1.5 km || 
|}

300401–300500 

|-bgcolor=#E9E9E9
| 300401 ||  || — || August 1, 1998 || Caussols || ODAS || — || align=right | 2.2 km || 
|-id=402 bgcolor=#E9E9E9
| 300402 ||  || — || September 14, 2007 || Mount Lemmon || Mount Lemmon Survey || — || align=right | 3.5 km || 
|-id=403 bgcolor=#fefefe
| 300403 ||  || — || September 15, 2007 || Kitt Peak || Spacewatch || V || align=right data-sort-value="0.69" | 690 m || 
|-id=404 bgcolor=#d6d6d6
| 300404 ||  || — || September 15, 2007 || Mount Lemmon || Mount Lemmon Survey || — || align=right | 4.2 km || 
|-id=405 bgcolor=#E9E9E9
| 300405 ||  || — || September 5, 2007 || Anderson Mesa || LONEOS || — || align=right | 2.0 km || 
|-id=406 bgcolor=#E9E9E9
| 300406 ||  || — || September 13, 2007 || Catalina || CSS || MAR || align=right | 1.6 km || 
|-id=407 bgcolor=#E9E9E9
| 300407 ||  || — || September 11, 2007 || Mount Lemmon || Mount Lemmon Survey || — || align=right data-sort-value="0.72" | 720 m || 
|-id=408 bgcolor=#E9E9E9
| 300408 ||  || — || September 12, 2007 || Mount Lemmon || Mount Lemmon Survey || — || align=right | 1.1 km || 
|-id=409 bgcolor=#E9E9E9
| 300409 ||  || — || September 9, 2007 || Mount Lemmon || Mount Lemmon Survey || — || align=right data-sort-value="0.87" | 870 m || 
|-id=410 bgcolor=#E9E9E9
| 300410 ||  || — || September 9, 2007 || Mount Lemmon || Mount Lemmon Survey || HEN || align=right | 1.2 km || 
|-id=411 bgcolor=#E9E9E9
| 300411 ||  || — || September 12, 2007 || Catalina || CSS || — || align=right | 1.2 km || 
|-id=412 bgcolor=#E9E9E9
| 300412 ||  || — || September 10, 2007 || Mount Lemmon || Mount Lemmon Survey || — || align=right | 3.0 km || 
|-id=413 bgcolor=#E9E9E9
| 300413 ||  || — || September 15, 2007 || Mount Lemmon || Mount Lemmon Survey || — || align=right | 2.5 km || 
|-id=414 bgcolor=#E9E9E9
| 300414 ||  || — || September 9, 2007 || Mount Lemmon || Mount Lemmon Survey || — || align=right | 2.2 km || 
|-id=415 bgcolor=#d6d6d6
| 300415 ||  || — || September 15, 2007 || Mount Lemmon || Mount Lemmon Survey || KOR || align=right | 1.5 km || 
|-id=416 bgcolor=#E9E9E9
| 300416 ||  || — || September 10, 2007 || Kitt Peak || Spacewatch || — || align=right | 1.4 km || 
|-id=417 bgcolor=#fefefe
| 300417 ||  || — || September 15, 2007 || Anderson Mesa || LONEOS || NYS || align=right data-sort-value="0.93" | 930 m || 
|-id=418 bgcolor=#E9E9E9
| 300418 ||  || — || September 11, 2007 || Kitt Peak || Spacewatch || — || align=right | 1.1 km || 
|-id=419 bgcolor=#E9E9E9
| 300419 ||  || — || September 14, 2007 || Socorro || LINEAR || EUN || align=right | 2.3 km || 
|-id=420 bgcolor=#E9E9E9
| 300420 ||  || — || September 11, 2007 || Catalina || CSS || — || align=right | 1.1 km || 
|-id=421 bgcolor=#E9E9E9
| 300421 ||  || — || September 21, 2007 || Purple Mountain || PMO NEO || — || align=right | 1.4 km || 
|-id=422 bgcolor=#fefefe
| 300422 ||  || — || September 30, 2007 || Kitt Peak || Spacewatch || V || align=right data-sort-value="0.83" | 830 m || 
|-id=423 bgcolor=#E9E9E9
| 300423 ||  || — || September 18, 2007 || Mount Lemmon || Mount Lemmon Survey || MIS || align=right | 2.6 km || 
|-id=424 bgcolor=#E9E9E9
| 300424 ||  || — || September 25, 2007 || Mount Lemmon || Mount Lemmon Survey || — || align=right | 2.3 km || 
|-id=425 bgcolor=#E9E9E9
| 300425 ||  || — || October 5, 2007 || Pla D'Arguines || R. Ferrando || — || align=right | 2.7 km || 
|-id=426 bgcolor=#E9E9E9
| 300426 ||  || — || October 3, 2007 || Hibiscus || N. Teamo || — || align=right | 1.6 km || 
|-id=427 bgcolor=#E9E9E9
| 300427 ||  || — || October 6, 2007 || Bergisch Gladbach || W. Bickel || — || align=right data-sort-value="0.80" | 800 m || 
|-id=428 bgcolor=#E9E9E9
| 300428 ||  || — || October 6, 2007 || Socorro || LINEAR || — || align=right | 2.0 km || 
|-id=429 bgcolor=#fefefe
| 300429 ||  || — || October 6, 2007 || Socorro || LINEAR || — || align=right | 1.2 km || 
|-id=430 bgcolor=#E9E9E9
| 300430 ||  || — || October 6, 2007 || Charleston || ARO || — || align=right | 2.1 km || 
|-id=431 bgcolor=#E9E9E9
| 300431 ||  || — || October 4, 2007 || Catalina || CSS || — || align=right | 1.4 km || 
|-id=432 bgcolor=#E9E9E9
| 300432 ||  || — || October 7, 2007 || Dauban || Chante-Perdrix Obs. || — || align=right | 2.7 km || 
|-id=433 bgcolor=#E9E9E9
| 300433 ||  || — || October 7, 2007 || Kitt Peak || Spacewatch || — || align=right | 3.0 km || 
|-id=434 bgcolor=#E9E9E9
| 300434 ||  || — || October 4, 2007 || Kitt Peak || Spacewatch || critical || align=right data-sort-value="0.78" | 780 m || 
|-id=435 bgcolor=#fefefe
| 300435 ||  || — || October 6, 2007 || Kitt Peak || Spacewatch || MAS || align=right data-sort-value="0.86" | 860 m || 
|-id=436 bgcolor=#E9E9E9
| 300436 ||  || — || October 6, 2007 || Kitt Peak || Spacewatch || — || align=right data-sort-value="0.74" | 740 m || 
|-id=437 bgcolor=#E9E9E9
| 300437 ||  || — || October 6, 2007 || Kitt Peak || Spacewatch || — || align=right | 1.9 km || 
|-id=438 bgcolor=#E9E9E9
| 300438 ||  || — || October 6, 2007 || Kitt Peak || Spacewatch || — || align=right | 1.9 km || 
|-id=439 bgcolor=#E9E9E9
| 300439 ||  || — || September 13, 2007 || Mount Lemmon || Mount Lemmon Survey || PAD || align=right | 1.7 km || 
|-id=440 bgcolor=#fefefe
| 300440 ||  || — || October 7, 2007 || Mount Lemmon || Mount Lemmon Survey || NYS || align=right data-sort-value="0.70" | 700 m || 
|-id=441 bgcolor=#E9E9E9
| 300441 ||  || — || October 7, 2007 || Mount Lemmon || Mount Lemmon Survey || — || align=right | 2.2 km || 
|-id=442 bgcolor=#E9E9E9
| 300442 ||  || — || October 7, 2007 || Mount Lemmon || Mount Lemmon Survey || — || align=right | 2.0 km || 
|-id=443 bgcolor=#E9E9E9
| 300443 ||  || — || October 4, 2007 || Kitt Peak || Spacewatch || — || align=right | 2.2 km || 
|-id=444 bgcolor=#E9E9E9
| 300444 ||  || — || October 4, 2007 || Kitt Peak || Spacewatch || MIS || align=right | 2.2 km || 
|-id=445 bgcolor=#E9E9E9
| 300445 ||  || — || October 4, 2007 || Kitt Peak || Spacewatch || — || align=right | 1.6 km || 
|-id=446 bgcolor=#E9E9E9
| 300446 ||  || — || October 4, 2007 || Kitt Peak || Spacewatch || BRG || align=right | 1.8 km || 
|-id=447 bgcolor=#E9E9E9
| 300447 ||  || — || October 4, 2007 || Kitt Peak || Spacewatch || MAR || align=right | 1.8 km || 
|-id=448 bgcolor=#E9E9E9
| 300448 ||  || — || October 4, 2007 || Kitt Peak || Spacewatch || — || align=right | 2.3 km || 
|-id=449 bgcolor=#E9E9E9
| 300449 ||  || — || October 5, 2007 || Kitt Peak || Spacewatch || — || align=right | 1.0 km || 
|-id=450 bgcolor=#E9E9E9
| 300450 ||  || — || October 7, 2007 || Mount Lemmon || Mount Lemmon Survey || — || align=right | 3.5 km || 
|-id=451 bgcolor=#E9E9E9
| 300451 ||  || — || October 10, 2007 || Goodricke-Pigott || R. A. Tucker || — || align=right | 1.2 km || 
|-id=452 bgcolor=#fefefe
| 300452 ||  || — || October 13, 2007 || Goodricke-Pigott || R. A. Tucker || — || align=right | 1.4 km || 
|-id=453 bgcolor=#E9E9E9
| 300453 ||  || — || October 8, 2007 || Catalina || CSS || JUN || align=right | 1.5 km || 
|-id=454 bgcolor=#E9E9E9
| 300454 ||  || — || October 13, 2007 || Goodricke-Pigott || R. A. Tucker || RAF || align=right | 1.4 km || 
|-id=455 bgcolor=#E9E9E9
| 300455 ||  || — || October 5, 2007 || Kitt Peak || Spacewatch || — || align=right | 1.1 km || 
|-id=456 bgcolor=#E9E9E9
| 300456 ||  || — || October 5, 2007 || Kitt Peak || Spacewatch || — || align=right data-sort-value="0.95" | 950 m || 
|-id=457 bgcolor=#E9E9E9
| 300457 ||  || — || October 5, 2007 || Kitt Peak || Spacewatch || — || align=right | 1.1 km || 
|-id=458 bgcolor=#E9E9E9
| 300458 ||  || — || October 7, 2007 || Mount Lemmon || Mount Lemmon Survey || HEN || align=right | 1.2 km || 
|-id=459 bgcolor=#E9E9E9
| 300459 ||  || — || October 8, 2007 || Mount Lemmon || Mount Lemmon Survey || — || align=right | 1.3 km || 
|-id=460 bgcolor=#E9E9E9
| 300460 ||  || — || October 8, 2007 || Mount Lemmon || Mount Lemmon Survey || — || align=right | 1.3 km || 
|-id=461 bgcolor=#E9E9E9
| 300461 ||  || — || October 8, 2007 || Catalina || CSS || JUN || align=right | 1.5 km || 
|-id=462 bgcolor=#E9E9E9
| 300462 ||  || — || October 8, 2007 || Mount Lemmon || Mount Lemmon Survey || HEN || align=right | 1.4 km || 
|-id=463 bgcolor=#E9E9E9
| 300463 ||  || — || October 8, 2007 || Mount Lemmon || Mount Lemmon Survey || — || align=right | 1.4 km || 
|-id=464 bgcolor=#E9E9E9
| 300464 ||  || — || October 8, 2007 || Mount Lemmon || Mount Lemmon Survey || — || align=right | 1.4 km || 
|-id=465 bgcolor=#E9E9E9
| 300465 ||  || — || October 7, 2007 || Catalina || CSS || — || align=right | 3.5 km || 
|-id=466 bgcolor=#E9E9E9
| 300466 ||  || — || October 8, 2007 || Mount Lemmon || Mount Lemmon Survey || — || align=right | 1.2 km || 
|-id=467 bgcolor=#E9E9E9
| 300467 ||  || — || October 8, 2007 || Mount Lemmon || Mount Lemmon Survey || — || align=right | 1.6 km || 
|-id=468 bgcolor=#E9E9E9
| 300468 ||  || — || October 4, 2007 || Kitt Peak || Spacewatch || — || align=right | 1.8 km || 
|-id=469 bgcolor=#fefefe
| 300469 ||  || — || October 4, 2007 || Catalina || CSS || V || align=right data-sort-value="0.98" | 980 m || 
|-id=470 bgcolor=#E9E9E9
| 300470 ||  || — || October 8, 2007 || Catalina || CSS || — || align=right | 1.1 km || 
|-id=471 bgcolor=#E9E9E9
| 300471 ||  || — || October 8, 2007 || Anderson Mesa || LONEOS || — || align=right | 1.9 km || 
|-id=472 bgcolor=#E9E9E9
| 300472 ||  || — || October 8, 2007 || Catalina || CSS || EUN || align=right | 2.1 km || 
|-id=473 bgcolor=#E9E9E9
| 300473 ||  || — || October 8, 2007 || Catalina || CSS || ADE || align=right | 3.3 km || 
|-id=474 bgcolor=#E9E9E9
| 300474 ||  || — || October 8, 2007 || Kitt Peak || Spacewatch || — || align=right | 1.9 km || 
|-id=475 bgcolor=#fefefe
| 300475 ||  || — || October 9, 2007 || Kitt Peak || Spacewatch || — || align=right data-sort-value="0.91" | 910 m || 
|-id=476 bgcolor=#E9E9E9
| 300476 ||  || — || October 9, 2007 || Kitt Peak || Spacewatch || — || align=right | 1.1 km || 
|-id=477 bgcolor=#d6d6d6
| 300477 ||  || — || October 9, 2007 || Mount Lemmon || Mount Lemmon Survey || BRA || align=right | 2.0 km || 
|-id=478 bgcolor=#E9E9E9
| 300478 ||  || — || October 4, 2007 || Kitt Peak || Spacewatch || — || align=right | 1.4 km || 
|-id=479 bgcolor=#E9E9E9
| 300479 ||  || — || October 6, 2007 || Kitt Peak || Spacewatch || EUN || align=right | 1.7 km || 
|-id=480 bgcolor=#E9E9E9
| 300480 ||  || — || October 6, 2007 || Kitt Peak || Spacewatch || — || align=right | 1.5 km || 
|-id=481 bgcolor=#E9E9E9
| 300481 ||  || — || October 6, 2007 || Kitt Peak || Spacewatch || WIT || align=right data-sort-value="0.99" | 990 m || 
|-id=482 bgcolor=#E9E9E9
| 300482 ||  || — || October 6, 2007 || Kitt Peak || Spacewatch || — || align=right | 2.0 km || 
|-id=483 bgcolor=#E9E9E9
| 300483 ||  || — || October 6, 2007 || Kitt Peak || Spacewatch || MIS || align=right | 2.6 km || 
|-id=484 bgcolor=#E9E9E9
| 300484 ||  || — || October 6, 2007 || Kitt Peak || Spacewatch || HEN || align=right | 1.2 km || 
|-id=485 bgcolor=#E9E9E9
| 300485 ||  || — || October 6, 2007 || Kitt Peak || Spacewatch || HEN || align=right | 1.3 km || 
|-id=486 bgcolor=#E9E9E9
| 300486 ||  || — || October 6, 2007 || Purple Mountain || PMO NEO || — || align=right | 1.4 km || 
|-id=487 bgcolor=#E9E9E9
| 300487 ||  || — || October 7, 2007 || Mount Lemmon || Mount Lemmon Survey || — || align=right data-sort-value="0.88" | 880 m || 
|-id=488 bgcolor=#E9E9E9
| 300488 ||  || — || October 7, 2007 || Mount Lemmon || Mount Lemmon Survey || NEM || align=right | 2.7 km || 
|-id=489 bgcolor=#E9E9E9
| 300489 ||  || — || October 7, 2007 || Mount Lemmon || Mount Lemmon Survey || — || align=right | 2.0 km || 
|-id=490 bgcolor=#fefefe
| 300490 ||  || — || October 8, 2007 || Kitt Peak || Spacewatch || V || align=right data-sort-value="0.90" | 900 m || 
|-id=491 bgcolor=#E9E9E9
| 300491 ||  || — || October 13, 2007 || Dauban || Chante-Perdrix Obs. || — || align=right | 2.2 km || 
|-id=492 bgcolor=#E9E9E9
| 300492 ||  || — || October 9, 2007 || Purple Mountain || PMO NEO || RAF || align=right | 1.2 km || 
|-id=493 bgcolor=#E9E9E9
| 300493 ||  || — || October 6, 2007 || Socorro || LINEAR || — || align=right | 1.0 km || 
|-id=494 bgcolor=#E9E9E9
| 300494 ||  || — || October 9, 2007 || Socorro || LINEAR || — || align=right | 2.7 km || 
|-id=495 bgcolor=#E9E9E9
| 300495 ||  || — || October 9, 2007 || Socorro || LINEAR || — || align=right | 2.2 km || 
|-id=496 bgcolor=#E9E9E9
| 300496 ||  || — || October 9, 2007 || Socorro || LINEAR || — || align=right | 1.4 km || 
|-id=497 bgcolor=#E9E9E9
| 300497 ||  || — || October 9, 2007 || Socorro || LINEAR || — || align=right | 1.1 km || 
|-id=498 bgcolor=#E9E9E9
| 300498 ||  || — || October 9, 2007 || Socorro || LINEAR || — || align=right | 2.3 km || 
|-id=499 bgcolor=#E9E9E9
| 300499 ||  || — || October 9, 2007 || Socorro || LINEAR || — || align=right | 3.0 km || 
|-id=500 bgcolor=#E9E9E9
| 300500 ||  || — || October 9, 2007 || Socorro || LINEAR || — || align=right | 1.2 km || 
|}

300501–300600 

|-bgcolor=#E9E9E9
| 300501 ||  || — || October 4, 2007 || Catalina || CSS || — || align=right | 1.8 km || 
|-id=502 bgcolor=#E9E9E9
| 300502 ||  || — || October 11, 2007 || Socorro || LINEAR || — || align=right data-sort-value="0.96" | 960 m || 
|-id=503 bgcolor=#E9E9E9
| 300503 ||  || — || October 11, 2007 || Socorro || LINEAR || — || align=right | 1.5 km || 
|-id=504 bgcolor=#E9E9E9
| 300504 ||  || — || October 11, 2007 || Socorro || LINEAR || — || align=right | 1.7 km || 
|-id=505 bgcolor=#E9E9E9
| 300505 ||  || — || October 13, 2007 || Socorro || LINEAR || — || align=right | 1.3 km || 
|-id=506 bgcolor=#E9E9E9
| 300506 ||  || — || October 4, 2007 || Kitt Peak || Spacewatch || — || align=right | 1.7 km || 
|-id=507 bgcolor=#E9E9E9
| 300507 ||  || — || October 4, 2007 || Kitt Peak || Spacewatch || — || align=right | 1.7 km || 
|-id=508 bgcolor=#E9E9E9
| 300508 ||  || — || October 4, 2007 || Purple Mountain || PMO NEO || HEN || align=right | 1.3 km || 
|-id=509 bgcolor=#E9E9E9
| 300509 ||  || — || October 6, 2007 || Purple Mountain || PMO NEO || EUN || align=right | 1.9 km || 
|-id=510 bgcolor=#E9E9E9
| 300510 ||  || — || October 8, 2007 || Mount Lemmon || Mount Lemmon Survey || — || align=right | 1.4 km || 
|-id=511 bgcolor=#E9E9E9
| 300511 ||  || — || October 9, 2007 || Kitt Peak || Spacewatch || — || align=right | 1.2 km || 
|-id=512 bgcolor=#E9E9E9
| 300512 ||  || — || October 13, 2007 || Socorro || LINEAR || RAF || align=right | 1.1 km || 
|-id=513 bgcolor=#E9E9E9
| 300513 ||  || — || October 13, 2007 || Socorro || LINEAR || — || align=right | 3.4 km || 
|-id=514 bgcolor=#fefefe
| 300514 ||  || — || October 14, 2007 || Socorro || LINEAR || V || align=right | 1.00 km || 
|-id=515 bgcolor=#fefefe
| 300515 ||  || — || October 4, 2007 || Mount Lemmon || Mount Lemmon Survey || NYS || align=right data-sort-value="0.72" | 720 m || 
|-id=516 bgcolor=#E9E9E9
| 300516 ||  || — || October 6, 2007 || Kitt Peak || Spacewatch || EUN || align=right | 1.3 km || 
|-id=517 bgcolor=#E9E9E9
| 300517 ||  || — || October 7, 2007 || Mount Lemmon || Mount Lemmon Survey || — || align=right | 2.2 km || 
|-id=518 bgcolor=#E9E9E9
| 300518 ||  || — || October 8, 2007 || Mount Lemmon || Mount Lemmon Survey || — || align=right | 2.4 km || 
|-id=519 bgcolor=#E9E9E9
| 300519 ||  || — || October 5, 2007 || Kitt Peak || Spacewatch || — || align=right | 4.0 km || 
|-id=520 bgcolor=#E9E9E9
| 300520 ||  || — || October 7, 2007 || Kitt Peak || Spacewatch || — || align=right | 2.4 km || 
|-id=521 bgcolor=#E9E9E9
| 300521 ||  || — || October 7, 2007 || Kitt Peak || Spacewatch || NEM || align=right | 2.2 km || 
|-id=522 bgcolor=#E9E9E9
| 300522 ||  || — || October 7, 2007 || Kitt Peak || Spacewatch || — || align=right | 1.9 km || 
|-id=523 bgcolor=#E9E9E9
| 300523 ||  || — || October 7, 2007 || Kitt Peak || Spacewatch || — || align=right | 2.0 km || 
|-id=524 bgcolor=#E9E9E9
| 300524 ||  || — || October 7, 2007 || Kitt Peak || Spacewatch || — || align=right | 1.3 km || 
|-id=525 bgcolor=#E9E9E9
| 300525 ||  || — || October 7, 2007 || Kitt Peak || Spacewatch || — || align=right | 1.9 km || 
|-id=526 bgcolor=#E9E9E9
| 300526 ||  || — || October 7, 2007 || Kitt Peak || Spacewatch || — || align=right | 2.8 km || 
|-id=527 bgcolor=#fefefe
| 300527 ||  || — || October 9, 2007 || Mount Lemmon || Mount Lemmon Survey || — || align=right | 1.3 km || 
|-id=528 bgcolor=#E9E9E9
| 300528 ||  || — || October 10, 2007 || Kitt Peak || Spacewatch || — || align=right | 1.6 km || 
|-id=529 bgcolor=#E9E9E9
| 300529 ||  || — || October 4, 2007 || Kitt Peak || Spacewatch || — || align=right | 2.1 km || 
|-id=530 bgcolor=#E9E9E9
| 300530 ||  || — || October 8, 2007 || Kitt Peak || Spacewatch || — || align=right | 1.7 km || 
|-id=531 bgcolor=#E9E9E9
| 300531 ||  || — || October 8, 2007 || Kitt Peak || Spacewatch || — || align=right | 1.6 km || 
|-id=532 bgcolor=#E9E9E9
| 300532 ||  || — || October 8, 2007 || Kitt Peak || Spacewatch || HEN || align=right data-sort-value="0.98" | 980 m || 
|-id=533 bgcolor=#E9E9E9
| 300533 ||  || — || October 8, 2007 || Kitt Peak || Spacewatch || WIT || align=right | 1.2 km || 
|-id=534 bgcolor=#E9E9E9
| 300534 ||  || — || October 9, 2007 || Mount Lemmon || Mount Lemmon Survey || — || align=right | 1.7 km || 
|-id=535 bgcolor=#E9E9E9
| 300535 ||  || — || October 10, 2007 || Kitt Peak || Spacewatch || — || align=right | 1.1 km || 
|-id=536 bgcolor=#E9E9E9
| 300536 ||  || — || October 10, 2007 || Mount Lemmon || Mount Lemmon Survey || — || align=right | 2.7 km || 
|-id=537 bgcolor=#E9E9E9
| 300537 ||  || — || October 8, 2007 || Catalina || CSS || — || align=right | 2.0 km || 
|-id=538 bgcolor=#E9E9E9
| 300538 ||  || — || October 8, 2007 || Catalina || CSS || — || align=right | 1.9 km || 
|-id=539 bgcolor=#E9E9E9
| 300539 ||  || — || October 9, 2007 || Catalina || CSS || JUN || align=right | 1.6 km || 
|-id=540 bgcolor=#E9E9E9
| 300540 ||  || — || October 8, 2007 || Mount Lemmon || Mount Lemmon Survey || — || align=right data-sort-value="0.69" | 690 m || 
|-id=541 bgcolor=#E9E9E9
| 300541 ||  || — || October 10, 2007 || Kitt Peak || Spacewatch || — || align=right | 2.2 km || 
|-id=542 bgcolor=#E9E9E9
| 300542 ||  || — || October 10, 2007 || Kitt Peak || Spacewatch || — || align=right data-sort-value="0.96" | 960 m || 
|-id=543 bgcolor=#E9E9E9
| 300543 ||  || — || October 10, 2007 || Kitt Peak || Spacewatch || — || align=right | 1.9 km || 
|-id=544 bgcolor=#E9E9E9
| 300544 ||  || — || October 10, 2007 || Kitt Peak || Spacewatch || — || align=right | 3.0 km || 
|-id=545 bgcolor=#E9E9E9
| 300545 ||  || — || October 10, 2007 || Kitt Peak || Spacewatch || — || align=right | 1.5 km || 
|-id=546 bgcolor=#E9E9E9
| 300546 ||  || — || October 10, 2007 || Kitt Peak || Spacewatch || — || align=right | 2.2 km || 
|-id=547 bgcolor=#E9E9E9
| 300547 ||  || — || October 10, 2007 || Kitt Peak || Spacewatch || — || align=right | 2.8 km || 
|-id=548 bgcolor=#fefefe
| 300548 ||  || — || October 9, 2007 || Kitt Peak || Spacewatch || — || align=right | 1.2 km || 
|-id=549 bgcolor=#E9E9E9
| 300549 ||  || — || October 9, 2007 || Kitt Peak || Spacewatch || — || align=right | 1.8 km || 
|-id=550 bgcolor=#E9E9E9
| 300550 ||  || — || October 9, 2007 || Kitt Peak || Spacewatch || EUN || align=right | 1.2 km || 
|-id=551 bgcolor=#E9E9E9
| 300551 ||  || — || October 9, 2007 || Kitt Peak || Spacewatch || — || align=right | 1.6 km || 
|-id=552 bgcolor=#E9E9E9
| 300552 ||  || — || October 9, 2007 || Kitt Peak || Spacewatch || HEN || align=right | 1.2 km || 
|-id=553 bgcolor=#E9E9E9
| 300553 ||  || — || October 9, 2007 || Kitt Peak || Spacewatch || — || align=right | 1.3 km || 
|-id=554 bgcolor=#E9E9E9
| 300554 ||  || — || October 11, 2007 || Mount Lemmon || Mount Lemmon Survey || — || align=right | 1.5 km || 
|-id=555 bgcolor=#E9E9E9
| 300555 ||  || — || October 8, 2007 || Mount Lemmon || Mount Lemmon Survey || MIS || align=right | 2.7 km || 
|-id=556 bgcolor=#E9E9E9
| 300556 ||  || — || October 10, 2007 || Mount Lemmon || Mount Lemmon Survey || — || align=right | 2.6 km || 
|-id=557 bgcolor=#E9E9E9
| 300557 ||  || — || October 11, 2007 || Mount Lemmon || Mount Lemmon Survey || — || align=right | 1.1 km || 
|-id=558 bgcolor=#E9E9E9
| 300558 ||  || — || October 12, 2007 || Kitt Peak || Spacewatch || — || align=right | 1.6 km || 
|-id=559 bgcolor=#E9E9E9
| 300559 ||  || — || October 12, 2007 || Kitt Peak || Spacewatch || — || align=right | 1.1 km || 
|-id=560 bgcolor=#E9E9E9
| 300560 ||  || — || October 12, 2007 || Kitt Peak || Spacewatch || — || align=right | 1.8 km || 
|-id=561 bgcolor=#E9E9E9
| 300561 ||  || — || October 13, 2007 || Catalina || CSS || — || align=right data-sort-value="0.89" | 890 m || 
|-id=562 bgcolor=#E9E9E9
| 300562 ||  || — || October 11, 2007 || Kitt Peak || Spacewatch || — || align=right | 2.0 km || 
|-id=563 bgcolor=#E9E9E9
| 300563 ||  || — || October 11, 2007 || Kitt Peak || Spacewatch || — || align=right | 2.6 km || 
|-id=564 bgcolor=#E9E9E9
| 300564 ||  || — || October 11, 2007 || Kitt Peak || Spacewatch || — || align=right | 1.7 km || 
|-id=565 bgcolor=#E9E9E9
| 300565 ||  || — || October 11, 2007 || Kitt Peak || Spacewatch || JUN || align=right | 1.1 km || 
|-id=566 bgcolor=#E9E9E9
| 300566 ||  || — || October 11, 2007 || Kitt Peak || Spacewatch || AGN || align=right | 1.2 km || 
|-id=567 bgcolor=#E9E9E9
| 300567 ||  || — || October 11, 2007 || Kitt Peak || Spacewatch || — || align=right | 1.9 km || 
|-id=568 bgcolor=#fefefe
| 300568 ||  || — || October 12, 2007 || Kitt Peak || Spacewatch || SUL || align=right | 2.1 km || 
|-id=569 bgcolor=#fefefe
| 300569 ||  || — || October 13, 2007 || Catalina || CSS || — || align=right | 1.2 km || 
|-id=570 bgcolor=#E9E9E9
| 300570 ||  || — || October 13, 2007 || Catalina || CSS || — || align=right | 1.0 km || 
|-id=571 bgcolor=#E9E9E9
| 300571 ||  || — || October 9, 2007 || Mount Lemmon || Mount Lemmon Survey || — || align=right | 2.0 km || 
|-id=572 bgcolor=#E9E9E9
| 300572 ||  || — || October 10, 2007 || Mount Lemmon || Mount Lemmon Survey || — || align=right | 1.6 km || 
|-id=573 bgcolor=#E9E9E9
| 300573 ||  || — || October 10, 2007 || Kitt Peak || Spacewatch || WIT || align=right | 1.3 km || 
|-id=574 bgcolor=#E9E9E9
| 300574 ||  || — || October 14, 2007 || Mount Lemmon || Mount Lemmon Survey || — || align=right | 2.4 km || 
|-id=575 bgcolor=#E9E9E9
| 300575 ||  || — || October 14, 2007 || Mount Lemmon || Mount Lemmon Survey || — || align=right | 2.7 km || 
|-id=576 bgcolor=#E9E9E9
| 300576 ||  || — || October 14, 2007 || Mount Lemmon || Mount Lemmon Survey || — || align=right | 1.8 km || 
|-id=577 bgcolor=#E9E9E9
| 300577 ||  || — || October 9, 2007 || Kitt Peak || Spacewatch || ADE || align=right | 2.8 km || 
|-id=578 bgcolor=#fefefe
| 300578 ||  || — || October 10, 2007 || Mount Lemmon || Mount Lemmon Survey || V || align=right data-sort-value="0.78" | 780 m || 
|-id=579 bgcolor=#E9E9E9
| 300579 ||  || — || October 10, 2007 || Mount Lemmon || Mount Lemmon Survey || — || align=right | 1.4 km || 
|-id=580 bgcolor=#E9E9E9
| 300580 ||  || — || October 12, 2007 || Mount Lemmon || Mount Lemmon Survey || NEM || align=right | 2.5 km || 
|-id=581 bgcolor=#E9E9E9
| 300581 ||  || — || October 13, 2007 || Mount Lemmon || Mount Lemmon Survey || — || align=right | 2.4 km || 
|-id=582 bgcolor=#E9E9E9
| 300582 ||  || — || October 14, 2007 || Kitt Peak || Spacewatch || EUN || align=right | 1.6 km || 
|-id=583 bgcolor=#E9E9E9
| 300583 ||  || — || October 15, 2007 || Catalina || CSS || — || align=right | 2.0 km || 
|-id=584 bgcolor=#E9E9E9
| 300584 ||  || — || October 15, 2007 || Catalina || CSS || EUN || align=right | 1.6 km || 
|-id=585 bgcolor=#fefefe
| 300585 ||  || — || October 13, 2007 || Mount Lemmon || Mount Lemmon Survey || — || align=right | 1.2 km || 
|-id=586 bgcolor=#E9E9E9
| 300586 ||  || — || October 13, 2007 || Catalina || CSS || — || align=right | 1.1 km || 
|-id=587 bgcolor=#E9E9E9
| 300587 ||  || — || October 13, 2007 || Kitt Peak || Spacewatch || — || align=right | 2.0 km || 
|-id=588 bgcolor=#E9E9E9
| 300588 ||  || — || October 15, 2007 || Kitt Peak || Spacewatch || — || align=right | 2.4 km || 
|-id=589 bgcolor=#E9E9E9
| 300589 ||  || — || October 15, 2007 || Mount Lemmon || Mount Lemmon Survey || — || align=right | 1.9 km || 
|-id=590 bgcolor=#E9E9E9
| 300590 ||  || — || October 15, 2007 || Kitt Peak || Spacewatch || — || align=right data-sort-value="0.99" | 990 m || 
|-id=591 bgcolor=#E9E9E9
| 300591 ||  || — || October 15, 2007 || Kitt Peak || Spacewatch || WIT || align=right | 1.1 km || 
|-id=592 bgcolor=#E9E9E9
| 300592 ||  || — || October 13, 2007 || Catalina || CSS || EUN || align=right | 1.6 km || 
|-id=593 bgcolor=#E9E9E9
| 300593 ||  || — || October 14, 2007 || Catalina || CSS || AER || align=right | 2.0 km || 
|-id=594 bgcolor=#E9E9E9
| 300594 ||  || — || October 4, 2007 || Kitt Peak || Spacewatch || AGN || align=right | 1.2 km || 
|-id=595 bgcolor=#E9E9E9
| 300595 ||  || — || October 13, 2007 || Kitt Peak || Spacewatch || — || align=right | 1.3 km || 
|-id=596 bgcolor=#E9E9E9
| 300596 ||  || — || October 14, 2007 || Mount Lemmon || Mount Lemmon Survey || — || align=right | 1.9 km || 
|-id=597 bgcolor=#E9E9E9
| 300597 ||  || — || October 11, 2007 || Catalina || CSS || MAR || align=right | 1.5 km || 
|-id=598 bgcolor=#E9E9E9
| 300598 ||  || — || October 9, 2007 || Kitt Peak || Spacewatch || — || align=right | 1.6 km || 
|-id=599 bgcolor=#d6d6d6
| 300599 ||  || — || October 15, 2007 || Mount Lemmon || Mount Lemmon Survey || CHA || align=right | 3.2 km || 
|-id=600 bgcolor=#d6d6d6
| 300600 ||  || — || October 15, 2007 || Mount Lemmon || Mount Lemmon Survey || — || align=right | 3.7 km || 
|}

300601–300700 

|-bgcolor=#E9E9E9
| 300601 ||  || — || October 6, 2007 || Kitt Peak || Spacewatch || — || align=right | 1.7 km || 
|-id=602 bgcolor=#E9E9E9
| 300602 ||  || — || October 7, 2007 || Kitt Peak || Spacewatch || — || align=right | 1.2 km || 
|-id=603 bgcolor=#E9E9E9
| 300603 ||  || — || October 9, 2007 || Catalina || CSS || MAR || align=right | 1.8 km || 
|-id=604 bgcolor=#fefefe
| 300604 ||  || — || October 4, 2007 || Catalina || CSS || — || align=right | 2.1 km || 
|-id=605 bgcolor=#E9E9E9
| 300605 ||  || — || October 4, 2007 || Kitt Peak || Spacewatch || HEN || align=right | 1.1 km || 
|-id=606 bgcolor=#E9E9E9
| 300606 ||  || — || October 4, 2007 || Kitt Peak || Spacewatch || — || align=right | 1.0 km || 
|-id=607 bgcolor=#E9E9E9
| 300607 ||  || — || October 10, 2007 || Catalina || CSS || KON || align=right | 2.4 km || 
|-id=608 bgcolor=#E9E9E9
| 300608 ||  || — || October 8, 2007 || Kitt Peak || Spacewatch || — || align=right | 1.2 km || 
|-id=609 bgcolor=#E9E9E9
| 300609 ||  || — || October 12, 2007 || Socorro || LINEAR || — || align=right | 2.4 km || 
|-id=610 bgcolor=#E9E9E9
| 300610 ||  || — || October 8, 2007 || Mount Lemmon || Mount Lemmon Survey || — || align=right | 1.1 km || 
|-id=611 bgcolor=#E9E9E9
| 300611 ||  || — || October 14, 2007 || Mount Lemmon || Mount Lemmon Survey || — || align=right | 1.7 km || 
|-id=612 bgcolor=#E9E9E9
| 300612 ||  || — || October 16, 2007 || Bisei SG Center || BATTeRS || — || align=right | 2.2 km || 
|-id=613 bgcolor=#E9E9E9
| 300613 ||  || — || October 20, 2007 || Bisei SG Center || BATTeRS || — || align=right | 1.6 km || 
|-id=614 bgcolor=#E9E9E9
| 300614 ||  || — || October 17, 2007 || Anderson Mesa || LONEOS || — || align=right | 2.3 km || 
|-id=615 bgcolor=#E9E9E9
| 300615 ||  || — || October 19, 2007 || Socorro || LINEAR || — || align=right | 1.5 km || 
|-id=616 bgcolor=#E9E9E9
| 300616 ||  || — || October 19, 2007 || Socorro || LINEAR || — || align=right | 2.5 km || 
|-id=617 bgcolor=#E9E9E9
| 300617 ||  || — || October 19, 2007 || Socorro || LINEAR || — || align=right | 2.1 km || 
|-id=618 bgcolor=#E9E9E9
| 300618 ||  || — || October 18, 2007 || Mount Lemmon || Mount Lemmon Survey || — || align=right | 2.0 km || 
|-id=619 bgcolor=#E9E9E9
| 300619 ||  || — || October 18, 2007 || Mount Lemmon || Mount Lemmon Survey || — || align=right | 1.5 km || 
|-id=620 bgcolor=#E9E9E9
| 300620 ||  || — || October 16, 2007 || Kitt Peak || Spacewatch || — || align=right | 1.4 km || 
|-id=621 bgcolor=#E9E9E9
| 300621 ||  || — || October 19, 2007 || Anderson Mesa || LONEOS || — || align=right | 1.4 km || 
|-id=622 bgcolor=#E9E9E9
| 300622 ||  || — || October 17, 2007 || Mount Lemmon || Mount Lemmon Survey || — || align=right | 2.8 km || 
|-id=623 bgcolor=#E9E9E9
| 300623 ||  || — || October 16, 2007 || Catalina || CSS || — || align=right | 2.7 km || 
|-id=624 bgcolor=#E9E9E9
| 300624 ||  || — || October 16, 2007 || Catalina || CSS || GER || align=right | 3.0 km || 
|-id=625 bgcolor=#E9E9E9
| 300625 ||  || — || October 19, 2007 || Catalina || CSS || — || align=right | 1.7 km || 
|-id=626 bgcolor=#E9E9E9
| 300626 ||  || — || March 17, 2005 || Kitt Peak || Spacewatch || HNS || align=right | 1.3 km || 
|-id=627 bgcolor=#E9E9E9
| 300627 ||  || — || September 10, 2007 || Mount Lemmon || Mount Lemmon Survey || — || align=right | 2.7 km || 
|-id=628 bgcolor=#E9E9E9
| 300628 ||  || — || October 20, 2007 || Mount Lemmon || Mount Lemmon Survey || — || align=right | 1.4 km || 
|-id=629 bgcolor=#E9E9E9
| 300629 ||  || — || October 16, 2007 || Kitt Peak || Spacewatch || — || align=right | 1.1 km || 
|-id=630 bgcolor=#E9E9E9
| 300630 ||  || — || January 11, 2000 || Kitt Peak || Spacewatch || — || align=right | 1.8 km || 
|-id=631 bgcolor=#E9E9E9
| 300631 ||  || — || October 18, 2007 || Kitt Peak || Spacewatch || — || align=right | 1.5 km || 
|-id=632 bgcolor=#E9E9E9
| 300632 ||  || — || October 20, 2007 || Catalina || CSS || — || align=right | 1.4 km || 
|-id=633 bgcolor=#E9E9E9
| 300633 ||  || — || October 19, 2007 || Anderson Mesa || LONEOS || — || align=right | 4.2 km || 
|-id=634 bgcolor=#E9E9E9
| 300634 Chuwenshin ||  ||  || October 19, 2007 || Lulin || H.-C. Lin, Q.-z. Ye || — || align=right | 1.5 km || 
|-id=635 bgcolor=#E9E9E9
| 300635 ||  || — || October 30, 2007 || Kitt Peak || Spacewatch || — || align=right | 1.7 km || 
|-id=636 bgcolor=#E9E9E9
| 300636 ||  || — || October 30, 2007 || Kitt Peak || Spacewatch || PAD || align=right | 1.9 km || 
|-id=637 bgcolor=#E9E9E9
| 300637 ||  || — || October 30, 2007 || Kitt Peak || Spacewatch || — || align=right | 1.7 km || 
|-id=638 bgcolor=#E9E9E9
| 300638 ||  || — || October 30, 2007 || Mount Lemmon || Mount Lemmon Survey || AEO || align=right | 1.1 km || 
|-id=639 bgcolor=#E9E9E9
| 300639 ||  || — || October 30, 2007 || Mount Lemmon || Mount Lemmon Survey || — || align=right | 1.1 km || 
|-id=640 bgcolor=#E9E9E9
| 300640 ||  || — || October 30, 2007 || Mount Lemmon || Mount Lemmon Survey || MAR || align=right | 1.2 km || 
|-id=641 bgcolor=#E9E9E9
| 300641 ||  || — || October 30, 2007 || Mount Lemmon || Mount Lemmon Survey || — || align=right | 2.0 km || 
|-id=642 bgcolor=#d6d6d6
| 300642 ||  || — || October 30, 2007 || Mount Lemmon || Mount Lemmon Survey || — || align=right | 4.1 km || 
|-id=643 bgcolor=#E9E9E9
| 300643 ||  || — || October 31, 2007 || Cordell-Lorenz || Cordell–Lorenz Obs. || — || align=right | 1.6 km || 
|-id=644 bgcolor=#E9E9E9
| 300644 ||  || — || October 31, 2007 || Kitt Peak || Spacewatch || — || align=right | 1.8 km || 
|-id=645 bgcolor=#E9E9E9
| 300645 ||  || — || October 31, 2007 || Mount Lemmon || Mount Lemmon Survey || HEN || align=right | 1.0 km || 
|-id=646 bgcolor=#E9E9E9
| 300646 ||  || — || October 30, 2007 || Kitt Peak || Spacewatch || — || align=right | 1.0 km || 
|-id=647 bgcolor=#E9E9E9
| 300647 ||  || — || October 30, 2007 || Kitt Peak || Spacewatch || — || align=right | 2.5 km || 
|-id=648 bgcolor=#E9E9E9
| 300648 ||  || — || October 30, 2007 || Kitt Peak || Spacewatch || AGN || align=right | 1.4 km || 
|-id=649 bgcolor=#E9E9E9
| 300649 ||  || — || October 30, 2007 || Kitt Peak || Spacewatch || HEN || align=right data-sort-value="0.98" | 980 m || 
|-id=650 bgcolor=#E9E9E9
| 300650 ||  || — || October 30, 2007 || Kitt Peak || Spacewatch || — || align=right | 1.9 km || 
|-id=651 bgcolor=#E9E9E9
| 300651 ||  || — || October 30, 2007 || Kitt Peak || Spacewatch || — || align=right | 1.2 km || 
|-id=652 bgcolor=#E9E9E9
| 300652 ||  || — || October 30, 2007 || Kitt Peak || Spacewatch || — || align=right | 1.5 km || 
|-id=653 bgcolor=#E9E9E9
| 300653 ||  || — || October 30, 2007 || Mount Lemmon || Mount Lemmon Survey || AST || align=right | 1.7 km || 
|-id=654 bgcolor=#E9E9E9
| 300654 ||  || — || October 30, 2007 || Kitt Peak || Spacewatch || — || align=right | 2.3 km || 
|-id=655 bgcolor=#d6d6d6
| 300655 ||  || — || October 30, 2007 || Kitt Peak || Spacewatch || KOR || align=right | 1.4 km || 
|-id=656 bgcolor=#E9E9E9
| 300656 ||  || — || October 30, 2007 || Kitt Peak || Spacewatch || — || align=right | 1.2 km || 
|-id=657 bgcolor=#E9E9E9
| 300657 ||  || — || October 30, 2007 || Kitt Peak || Spacewatch || — || align=right | 2.3 km || 
|-id=658 bgcolor=#E9E9E9
| 300658 ||  || — || October 31, 2007 || Mount Lemmon || Mount Lemmon Survey || — || align=right | 2.7 km || 
|-id=659 bgcolor=#E9E9E9
| 300659 ||  || — || October 30, 2007 || Kitt Peak || Spacewatch || — || align=right | 1.8 km || 
|-id=660 bgcolor=#E9E9E9
| 300660 ||  || — || October 31, 2007 || Catalina || CSS || — || align=right | 1.7 km || 
|-id=661 bgcolor=#E9E9E9
| 300661 ||  || — || October 18, 2007 || Mount Lemmon || Mount Lemmon Survey || HEN || align=right data-sort-value="0.91" | 910 m || 
|-id=662 bgcolor=#E9E9E9
| 300662 ||  || — || October 19, 2007 || Catalina || CSS || — || align=right | 1.4 km || 
|-id=663 bgcolor=#E9E9E9
| 300663 ||  || — || October 24, 2007 || Mount Lemmon || Mount Lemmon Survey || — || align=right | 2.9 km || 
|-id=664 bgcolor=#d6d6d6
| 300664 ||  || — || October 30, 2007 || Kitt Peak || Spacewatch || KOR || align=right | 1.4 km || 
|-id=665 bgcolor=#E9E9E9
| 300665 ||  || — || October 19, 2007 || Anderson Mesa || LONEOS || — || align=right | 1.9 km || 
|-id=666 bgcolor=#E9E9E9
| 300666 ||  || — || October 18, 2007 || Kitt Peak || Spacewatch || — || align=right | 2.3 km || 
|-id=667 bgcolor=#E9E9E9
| 300667 ||  || — || October 21, 2007 || Mount Lemmon || Mount Lemmon Survey || — || align=right | 2.8 km || 
|-id=668 bgcolor=#E9E9E9
| 300668 ||  || — || October 18, 2007 || Kitt Peak || Spacewatch || WIT || align=right data-sort-value="0.96" | 960 m || 
|-id=669 bgcolor=#E9E9E9
| 300669 ||  || — || November 3, 2007 || Majorca || OAM Obs. || EUN || align=right | 1.5 km || 
|-id=670 bgcolor=#E9E9E9
| 300670 ||  || — || November 4, 2007 || Dauban || Chante-Perdrix Obs. || — || align=right | 1.5 km || 
|-id=671 bgcolor=#E9E9E9
| 300671 ||  || — || November 1, 2007 || Kitt Peak || Spacewatch || — || align=right | 3.1 km || 
|-id=672 bgcolor=#E9E9E9
| 300672 ||  || — || November 2, 2007 || Mount Lemmon || Mount Lemmon Survey || — || align=right | 1.9 km || 
|-id=673 bgcolor=#E9E9E9
| 300673 ||  || — || November 5, 2007 || Purple Mountain || PMO NEO || — || align=right | 3.2 km || 
|-id=674 bgcolor=#E9E9E9
| 300674 ||  || — || November 1, 2007 || Kitt Peak || Spacewatch || — || align=right | 1.9 km || 
|-id=675 bgcolor=#E9E9E9
| 300675 ||  || — || November 1, 2007 || Mount Lemmon || Mount Lemmon Survey || — || align=right | 2.5 km || 
|-id=676 bgcolor=#E9E9E9
| 300676 ||  || — || November 1, 2007 || Kitt Peak || Spacewatch || — || align=right | 1.2 km || 
|-id=677 bgcolor=#E9E9E9
| 300677 ||  || — || November 1, 2007 || Kitt Peak || Spacewatch || AGN || align=right | 1.2 km || 
|-id=678 bgcolor=#E9E9E9
| 300678 ||  || — || November 2, 2007 || Mount Lemmon || Mount Lemmon Survey || — || align=right | 2.8 km || 
|-id=679 bgcolor=#E9E9E9
| 300679 ||  || — || November 2, 2007 || Catalina || CSS || INO || align=right | 1.4 km || 
|-id=680 bgcolor=#E9E9E9
| 300680 ||  || — || November 2, 2007 || Mount Lemmon || Mount Lemmon Survey || — || align=right | 1.8 km || 
|-id=681 bgcolor=#E9E9E9
| 300681 ||  || — || November 2, 2007 || Mount Lemmon || Mount Lemmon Survey || — || align=right | 1.6 km || 
|-id=682 bgcolor=#E9E9E9
| 300682 ||  || — || November 3, 2007 || Mount Lemmon || Mount Lemmon Survey || — || align=right | 1.5 km || 
|-id=683 bgcolor=#E9E9E9
| 300683 ||  || — || November 2, 2007 || Kitt Peak || Spacewatch || — || align=right | 2.8 km || 
|-id=684 bgcolor=#E9E9E9
| 300684 ||  || — || November 2, 2007 || Kitt Peak || Spacewatch || — || align=right | 2.4 km || 
|-id=685 bgcolor=#E9E9E9
| 300685 ||  || — || November 2, 2007 || Kitt Peak || Spacewatch || — || align=right | 3.6 km || 
|-id=686 bgcolor=#fefefe
| 300686 ||  || — || November 3, 2007 || Mount Lemmon || Mount Lemmon Survey || — || align=right | 1.4 km || 
|-id=687 bgcolor=#E9E9E9
| 300687 ||  || — || November 1, 2007 || Kitt Peak || Spacewatch || — || align=right | 2.1 km || 
|-id=688 bgcolor=#E9E9E9
| 300688 ||  || — || November 1, 2007 || Kitt Peak || Spacewatch || — || align=right | 2.9 km || 
|-id=689 bgcolor=#E9E9E9
| 300689 ||  || — || November 1, 2007 || Kitt Peak || Spacewatch || — || align=right | 1.8 km || 
|-id=690 bgcolor=#E9E9E9
| 300690 ||  || — || November 1, 2007 || Kitt Peak || Spacewatch || GEF || align=right | 1.8 km || 
|-id=691 bgcolor=#E9E9E9
| 300691 ||  || — || November 1, 2007 || Kitt Peak || Spacewatch || — || align=right | 2.2 km || 
|-id=692 bgcolor=#E9E9E9
| 300692 ||  || — || November 1, 2007 || Kitt Peak || Spacewatch || AGN || align=right | 1.4 km || 
|-id=693 bgcolor=#E9E9E9
| 300693 ||  || — || November 1, 2007 || Kitt Peak || Spacewatch || HOF || align=right | 3.3 km || 
|-id=694 bgcolor=#E9E9E9
| 300694 ||  || — || November 1, 2007 || Kitt Peak || Spacewatch || — || align=right | 1.2 km || 
|-id=695 bgcolor=#E9E9E9
| 300695 ||  || — || November 1, 2007 || Kitt Peak || Spacewatch || — || align=right | 1.6 km || 
|-id=696 bgcolor=#E9E9E9
| 300696 ||  || — || November 1, 2007 || Kitt Peak || Spacewatch || — || align=right | 1.9 km || 
|-id=697 bgcolor=#E9E9E9
| 300697 ||  || — || November 1, 2007 || Kitt Peak || Spacewatch || — || align=right | 3.4 km || 
|-id=698 bgcolor=#E9E9E9
| 300698 ||  || — || November 2, 2007 || Kitt Peak || Spacewatch || — || align=right | 1.7 km || 
|-id=699 bgcolor=#E9E9E9
| 300699 ||  || — || November 3, 2007 || Mount Lemmon || Mount Lemmon Survey || HOF || align=right | 2.6 km || 
|-id=700 bgcolor=#E9E9E9
| 300700 ||  || — || November 1, 2007 || Kitt Peak || Spacewatch || HEN || align=right | 1.4 km || 
|}

300701–300800 

|-bgcolor=#E9E9E9
| 300701 ||  || — || November 4, 2007 || Socorro || LINEAR || — || align=right | 3.0 km || 
|-id=702 bgcolor=#E9E9E9
| 300702 ||  || — || November 6, 2007 || Socorro || LINEAR || RAF || align=right | 1.5 km || 
|-id=703 bgcolor=#E9E9E9
| 300703 ||  || — || November 7, 2007 || Bisei SG Center || BATTeRS || CLO || align=right | 2.2 km || 
|-id=704 bgcolor=#E9E9E9
| 300704 ||  || — || November 7, 2007 || Bisei SG Center || BATTeRS || — || align=right | 1.2 km || 
|-id=705 bgcolor=#E9E9E9
| 300705 ||  || — || November 2, 2007 || Kitt Peak || Spacewatch || — || align=right | 3.1 km || 
|-id=706 bgcolor=#d6d6d6
| 300706 ||  || — || November 2, 2007 || Kitt Peak || Spacewatch || EOS || align=right | 3.3 km || 
|-id=707 bgcolor=#E9E9E9
| 300707 ||  || — || November 2, 2007 || Mount Lemmon || Mount Lemmon Survey || JUN || align=right | 1.6 km || 
|-id=708 bgcolor=#E9E9E9
| 300708 ||  || — || November 3, 2007 || Kitt Peak || Spacewatch || — || align=right data-sort-value="0.98" | 980 m || 
|-id=709 bgcolor=#d6d6d6
| 300709 ||  || — || November 3, 2007 || Kitt Peak || Spacewatch || — || align=right | 3.1 km || 
|-id=710 bgcolor=#E9E9E9
| 300710 ||  || — || November 3, 2007 || Kitt Peak || Spacewatch || WIT || align=right | 1.3 km || 
|-id=711 bgcolor=#E9E9E9
| 300711 ||  || — || November 3, 2007 || Kitt Peak || Spacewatch || — || align=right | 2.6 km || 
|-id=712 bgcolor=#d6d6d6
| 300712 ||  || — || November 3, 2007 || Kitt Peak || Spacewatch || — || align=right | 3.0 km || 
|-id=713 bgcolor=#d6d6d6
| 300713 ||  || — || November 3, 2007 || Kitt Peak || Spacewatch || EOS || align=right | 2.3 km || 
|-id=714 bgcolor=#E9E9E9
| 300714 ||  || — || November 3, 2007 || Kitt Peak || Spacewatch || — || align=right | 1.7 km || 
|-id=715 bgcolor=#E9E9E9
| 300715 ||  || — || November 3, 2007 || Lulin || LUSS || — || align=right | 2.2 km || 
|-id=716 bgcolor=#E9E9E9
| 300716 ||  || — || November 4, 2007 || Kitt Peak || Spacewatch || — || align=right | 1.7 km || 
|-id=717 bgcolor=#E9E9E9
| 300717 ||  || — || November 5, 2007 || Kitt Peak || Spacewatch || HEN || align=right | 1.1 km || 
|-id=718 bgcolor=#E9E9E9
| 300718 ||  || — || November 5, 2007 || Kitt Peak || Spacewatch || — || align=right | 1.3 km || 
|-id=719 bgcolor=#E9E9E9
| 300719 ||  || — || November 5, 2007 || Kitt Peak || Spacewatch || NEM || align=right | 2.1 km || 
|-id=720 bgcolor=#E9E9E9
| 300720 ||  || — || November 5, 2007 || Kitt Peak || Spacewatch || — || align=right | 1.7 km || 
|-id=721 bgcolor=#d6d6d6
| 300721 ||  || — || November 5, 2007 || Mount Lemmon || Mount Lemmon Survey || — || align=right | 2.7 km || 
|-id=722 bgcolor=#d6d6d6
| 300722 ||  || — || November 5, 2007 || Kitt Peak || Spacewatch || — || align=right | 3.0 km || 
|-id=723 bgcolor=#E9E9E9
| 300723 ||  || — || November 5, 2007 || Purple Mountain || PMO NEO || — || align=right | 1.2 km || 
|-id=724 bgcolor=#E9E9E9
| 300724 ||  || — || November 7, 2007 || Catalina || CSS || EUN || align=right | 1.5 km || 
|-id=725 bgcolor=#E9E9E9
| 300725 ||  || — || November 2, 2007 || Mount Lemmon || Mount Lemmon Survey || ADE || align=right | 2.2 km || 
|-id=726 bgcolor=#E9E9E9
| 300726 ||  || — || November 2, 2007 || Mount Lemmon || Mount Lemmon Survey || — || align=right | 1.1 km || 
|-id=727 bgcolor=#E9E9E9
| 300727 ||  || — || November 2, 2007 || Catalina || CSS || EUN || align=right | 1.5 km || 
|-id=728 bgcolor=#d6d6d6
| 300728 ||  || — || November 6, 2007 || Purple Mountain || PMO NEO || ITH || align=right | 1.9 km || 
|-id=729 bgcolor=#E9E9E9
| 300729 ||  || — || November 4, 2007 || Kitt Peak || Spacewatch || — || align=right | 1.6 km || 
|-id=730 bgcolor=#d6d6d6
| 300730 ||  || — || November 4, 2007 || Kitt Peak || Spacewatch || KOR || align=right | 1.7 km || 
|-id=731 bgcolor=#E9E9E9
| 300731 ||  || — || November 4, 2007 || Kitt Peak || Spacewatch || HOF || align=right | 3.4 km || 
|-id=732 bgcolor=#E9E9E9
| 300732 ||  || — || November 4, 2007 || Kitt Peak || Spacewatch || HEN || align=right | 1.3 km || 
|-id=733 bgcolor=#E9E9E9
| 300733 ||  || — || November 4, 2007 || Kitt Peak || Spacewatch || — || align=right | 2.7 km || 
|-id=734 bgcolor=#E9E9E9
| 300734 ||  || — || January 28, 2004 || Kitt Peak || Spacewatch || AGN || align=right | 1.6 km || 
|-id=735 bgcolor=#d6d6d6
| 300735 ||  || — || November 4, 2007 || Kitt Peak || Spacewatch || — || align=right | 2.8 km || 
|-id=736 bgcolor=#fefefe
| 300736 ||  || — || November 7, 2007 || Mount Lemmon || Mount Lemmon Survey || — || align=right data-sort-value="0.94" | 940 m || 
|-id=737 bgcolor=#E9E9E9
| 300737 ||  || — || November 7, 2007 || Mount Lemmon || Mount Lemmon Survey || — || align=right | 1.3 km || 
|-id=738 bgcolor=#E9E9E9
| 300738 ||  || — || November 5, 2007 || Kitt Peak || Spacewatch || — || align=right | 1.7 km || 
|-id=739 bgcolor=#E9E9E9
| 300739 ||  || — || November 5, 2007 || Kitt Peak || Spacewatch || — || align=right | 1.7 km || 
|-id=740 bgcolor=#E9E9E9
| 300740 ||  || — || November 5, 2007 || Kitt Peak || Spacewatch || — || align=right | 2.8 km || 
|-id=741 bgcolor=#d6d6d6
| 300741 ||  || — || November 5, 2007 || Kitt Peak || Spacewatch || — || align=right | 3.3 km || 
|-id=742 bgcolor=#E9E9E9
| 300742 ||  || — || November 5, 2007 || Kitt Peak || Spacewatch || HOF || align=right | 3.1 km || 
|-id=743 bgcolor=#E9E9E9
| 300743 ||  || — || November 7, 2007 || Kitt Peak || Spacewatch || — || align=right | 2.0 km || 
|-id=744 bgcolor=#E9E9E9
| 300744 ||  || — || November 7, 2007 || Catalina || CSS || — || align=right | 1.9 km || 
|-id=745 bgcolor=#E9E9E9
| 300745 ||  || — || November 13, 2007 || La Sagra || OAM Obs. || — || align=right | 3.6 km || 
|-id=746 bgcolor=#E9E9E9
| 300746 ||  || — || November 8, 2007 || Kitt Peak || Spacewatch || — || align=right | 1.7 km || 
|-id=747 bgcolor=#E9E9E9
| 300747 ||  || — || November 4, 2007 || Mount Lemmon || Mount Lemmon Survey || — || align=right | 2.3 km || 
|-id=748 bgcolor=#E9E9E9
| 300748 ||  || — || November 4, 2007 || Mount Lemmon || Mount Lemmon Survey || — || align=right | 1.4 km || 
|-id=749 bgcolor=#E9E9E9
| 300749 ||  || — || November 4, 2007 || Mount Lemmon || Mount Lemmon Survey || — || align=right | 2.4 km || 
|-id=750 bgcolor=#d6d6d6
| 300750 ||  || — || November 9, 2007 || Mount Lemmon || Mount Lemmon Survey || — || align=right | 3.8 km || 
|-id=751 bgcolor=#E9E9E9
| 300751 ||  || — || November 7, 2007 || Kitt Peak || Spacewatch || NEM || align=right | 2.2 km || 
|-id=752 bgcolor=#E9E9E9
| 300752 ||  || — || November 9, 2007 || Kitt Peak || Spacewatch || NEM || align=right | 2.3 km || 
|-id=753 bgcolor=#E9E9E9
| 300753 ||  || — || November 9, 2007 || Kitt Peak || Spacewatch || — || align=right | 3.6 km || 
|-id=754 bgcolor=#E9E9E9
| 300754 ||  || — || November 12, 2007 || Mount Lemmon || Mount Lemmon Survey || — || align=right | 1.2 km || 
|-id=755 bgcolor=#E9E9E9
| 300755 ||  || — || November 13, 2007 || Kitt Peak || Spacewatch || AST || align=right | 2.1 km || 
|-id=756 bgcolor=#E9E9E9
| 300756 ||  || — || November 9, 2007 || Mount Lemmon || Mount Lemmon Survey || — || align=right | 1.4 km || 
|-id=757 bgcolor=#E9E9E9
| 300757 ||  || — || November 7, 2007 || Kitt Peak || Spacewatch || — || align=right | 2.6 km || 
|-id=758 bgcolor=#E9E9E9
| 300758 ||  || — || November 7, 2007 || Kitt Peak || Spacewatch || HOF || align=right | 2.6 km || 
|-id=759 bgcolor=#E9E9E9
| 300759 ||  || — || November 9, 2007 || Eskridge || G. Hug || HOF || align=right | 2.4 km || 
|-id=760 bgcolor=#E9E9E9
| 300760 ||  || — || November 9, 2007 || Kitt Peak || Spacewatch || — || align=right | 1.8 km || 
|-id=761 bgcolor=#E9E9E9
| 300761 ||  || — || November 11, 2007 || Mount Lemmon || Mount Lemmon Survey || — || align=right | 1.2 km || 
|-id=762 bgcolor=#E9E9E9
| 300762 ||  || — || November 13, 2007 || Kitt Peak || Spacewatch || GEF || align=right | 1.5 km || 
|-id=763 bgcolor=#E9E9E9
| 300763 ||  || — || November 7, 2007 || Catalina || CSS || KON || align=right | 2.4 km || 
|-id=764 bgcolor=#E9E9E9
| 300764 ||  || — || November 13, 2007 || Mount Lemmon || Mount Lemmon Survey || HOF || align=right | 2.8 km || 
|-id=765 bgcolor=#E9E9E9
| 300765 ||  || — || November 15, 2007 || La Sagra || OAM Obs. || — || align=right | 2.4 km || 
|-id=766 bgcolor=#d6d6d6
| 300766 ||  || — || November 14, 2007 || Bisei SG Center || BATTeRS || — || align=right | 2.8 km || 
|-id=767 bgcolor=#d6d6d6
| 300767 ||  || — || November 13, 2007 || Mount Lemmon || Mount Lemmon Survey || — || align=right | 4.4 km || 
|-id=768 bgcolor=#E9E9E9
| 300768 ||  || — || November 9, 2007 || Catalina || CSS || — || align=right | 2.0 km || 
|-id=769 bgcolor=#E9E9E9
| 300769 ||  || — || November 10, 2007 || Mount Lemmon || Mount Lemmon Survey || — || align=right | 2.1 km || 
|-id=770 bgcolor=#E9E9E9
| 300770 ||  || — || November 12, 2007 || Catalina || CSS || — || align=right | 1.3 km || 
|-id=771 bgcolor=#E9E9E9
| 300771 ||  || — || November 13, 2007 || Catalina || CSS || — || align=right | 2.7 km || 
|-id=772 bgcolor=#E9E9E9
| 300772 ||  || — || November 13, 2007 || Catalina || CSS || — || align=right | 1.3 km || 
|-id=773 bgcolor=#d6d6d6
| 300773 ||  || — || November 15, 2007 || Mount Lemmon || Mount Lemmon Survey || — || align=right | 3.6 km || 
|-id=774 bgcolor=#E9E9E9
| 300774 ||  || — || November 13, 2007 || Kitt Peak || Spacewatch || — || align=right | 1.9 km || 
|-id=775 bgcolor=#E9E9E9
| 300775 ||  || — || November 13, 2007 || Kitt Peak || Spacewatch || — || align=right | 1.8 km || 
|-id=776 bgcolor=#E9E9E9
| 300776 ||  || — || November 12, 2007 || Socorro || LINEAR || — || align=right | 2.0 km || 
|-id=777 bgcolor=#E9E9E9
| 300777 ||  || — || November 14, 2007 || Kitt Peak || Spacewatch || — || align=right | 3.1 km || 
|-id=778 bgcolor=#E9E9E9
| 300778 ||  || — || November 14, 2007 || Kitt Peak || Spacewatch || — || align=right | 2.1 km || 
|-id=779 bgcolor=#d6d6d6
| 300779 ||  || — || November 14, 2007 || Kitt Peak || Spacewatch || KAR || align=right | 1.3 km || 
|-id=780 bgcolor=#E9E9E9
| 300780 ||  || — || November 14, 2007 || Kitt Peak || Spacewatch || — || align=right | 1.8 km || 
|-id=781 bgcolor=#E9E9E9
| 300781 ||  || — || November 15, 2007 || Catalina || CSS || JUN || align=right | 1.2 km || 
|-id=782 bgcolor=#E9E9E9
| 300782 ||  || — || November 15, 2007 || Catalina || CSS || ADE || align=right | 3.3 km || 
|-id=783 bgcolor=#E9E9E9
| 300783 ||  || — || November 15, 2007 || Catalina || CSS || EUN || align=right | 1.7 km || 
|-id=784 bgcolor=#E9E9E9
| 300784 ||  || — || November 12, 2007 || Catalina || CSS || JUN || align=right | 1.0 km || 
|-id=785 bgcolor=#E9E9E9
| 300785 ||  || — || November 3, 2007 || Catalina || CSS || — || align=right | 3.0 km || 
|-id=786 bgcolor=#E9E9E9
| 300786 ||  || — || November 9, 2007 || Mount Lemmon || Mount Lemmon Survey || WIT || align=right | 1.2 km || 
|-id=787 bgcolor=#E9E9E9
| 300787 ||  || — || November 2, 2007 || Kitt Peak || Spacewatch || AGN || align=right | 1.9 km || 
|-id=788 bgcolor=#E9E9E9
| 300788 ||  || — || November 5, 2007 || Mount Lemmon || Mount Lemmon Survey || PAD || align=right | 2.1 km || 
|-id=789 bgcolor=#E9E9E9
| 300789 ||  || — || November 6, 2007 || Kitt Peak || Spacewatch || WIT || align=right | 1.1 km || 
|-id=790 bgcolor=#E9E9E9
| 300790 ||  || — || November 1, 2007 || Kitt Peak || Spacewatch || WIT || align=right data-sort-value="0.99" | 990 m || 
|-id=791 bgcolor=#E9E9E9
| 300791 ||  || — || November 8, 2007 || Kitt Peak || Spacewatch || GEF || align=right | 1.7 km || 
|-id=792 bgcolor=#E9E9E9
| 300792 ||  || — || November 13, 2007 || Mount Lemmon || Mount Lemmon Survey || — || align=right | 2.7 km || 
|-id=793 bgcolor=#E9E9E9
| 300793 ||  || — || November 8, 2007 || Catalina || CSS || JUN || align=right | 1.6 km || 
|-id=794 bgcolor=#E9E9E9
| 300794 ||  || — || November 4, 2007 || Socorro || LINEAR || — || align=right | 1.6 km || 
|-id=795 bgcolor=#E9E9E9
| 300795 ||  || — || November 6, 2007 || Kitt Peak || Spacewatch || — || align=right | 1.9 km || 
|-id=796 bgcolor=#E9E9E9
| 300796 ||  || — || November 7, 2007 || Kitt Peak || Spacewatch || AGN || align=right | 1.2 km || 
|-id=797 bgcolor=#E9E9E9
| 300797 ||  || — || November 7, 2007 || Kitt Peak || Spacewatch || AGN || align=right | 1.8 km || 
|-id=798 bgcolor=#d6d6d6
| 300798 ||  || — || November 7, 2007 || Mount Lemmon || Mount Lemmon Survey || — || align=right | 3.3 km || 
|-id=799 bgcolor=#d6d6d6
| 300799 ||  || — || November 7, 2007 || Mount Lemmon || Mount Lemmon Survey || — || align=right | 5.1 km || 
|-id=800 bgcolor=#E9E9E9
| 300800 ||  || — || November 7, 2007 || Socorro || LINEAR || — || align=right | 1.2 km || 
|}

300801–300900 

|-bgcolor=#E9E9E9
| 300801 ||  || — || November 7, 2007 || Socorro || LINEAR || — || align=right | 1.5 km || 
|-id=802 bgcolor=#E9E9E9
| 300802 ||  || — || November 17, 2007 || Bisei SG Center || BATTeRS || — || align=right | 1.2 km || 
|-id=803 bgcolor=#E9E9E9
| 300803 ||  || — || November 16, 2007 || Dauban || Chante-Perdrix Obs. || NEM || align=right | 3.0 km || 
|-id=804 bgcolor=#E9E9E9
| 300804 ||  || — || November 17, 2007 || Bisei SG Center || BATTeRS || NEM || align=right | 2.5 km || 
|-id=805 bgcolor=#E9E9E9
| 300805 ||  || — || November 17, 2007 || Socorro || LINEAR || — || align=right | 1.9 km || 
|-id=806 bgcolor=#E9E9E9
| 300806 ||  || — || November 18, 2007 || Socorro || LINEAR || — || align=right | 1.8 km || 
|-id=807 bgcolor=#E9E9E9
| 300807 ||  || — || November 18, 2007 || Socorro || LINEAR || — || align=right | 1.8 km || 
|-id=808 bgcolor=#E9E9E9
| 300808 ||  || — || November 17, 2007 || Catalina || CSS || — || align=right | 2.2 km || 
|-id=809 bgcolor=#d6d6d6
| 300809 ||  || — || November 18, 2007 || Mount Lemmon || Mount Lemmon Survey || — || align=right | 2.4 km || 
|-id=810 bgcolor=#E9E9E9
| 300810 ||  || — || November 18, 2007 || Mount Lemmon || Mount Lemmon Survey || PAD || align=right | 2.2 km || 
|-id=811 bgcolor=#E9E9E9
| 300811 ||  || — || November 17, 2007 || Kitt Peak || Spacewatch || — || align=right | 1.7 km || 
|-id=812 bgcolor=#E9E9E9
| 300812 ||  || — || November 17, 2007 || Kitt Peak || Spacewatch || — || align=right | 2.1 km || 
|-id=813 bgcolor=#E9E9E9
| 300813 ||  || — || November 18, 2007 || Mount Lemmon || Mount Lemmon Survey || — || align=right | 2.6 km || 
|-id=814 bgcolor=#E9E9E9
| 300814 ||  || — || September 14, 2007 || Mount Lemmon || Mount Lemmon Survey || NEM || align=right | 2.4 km || 
|-id=815 bgcolor=#E9E9E9
| 300815 ||  || — || November 19, 2007 || Mount Lemmon || Mount Lemmon Survey || AGN || align=right | 1.5 km || 
|-id=816 bgcolor=#E9E9E9
| 300816 ||  || — || November 19, 2007 || Mount Lemmon || Mount Lemmon Survey || WIT || align=right | 1.2 km || 
|-id=817 bgcolor=#E9E9E9
| 300817 ||  || — || November 19, 2007 || Mount Lemmon || Mount Lemmon Survey || HNA || align=right | 2.5 km || 
|-id=818 bgcolor=#d6d6d6
| 300818 ||  || — || November 19, 2007 || Mount Lemmon || Mount Lemmon Survey || — || align=right | 2.8 km || 
|-id=819 bgcolor=#E9E9E9
| 300819 ||  || — || November 20, 2007 || Mount Lemmon || Mount Lemmon Survey || — || align=right | 2.9 km || 
|-id=820 bgcolor=#E9E9E9
| 300820 ||  || — || November 17, 2007 || Eskridge || G. Hug || — || align=right | 1.7 km || 
|-id=821 bgcolor=#E9E9E9
| 300821 ||  || — || November 30, 2007 || La Sagra || OAM Obs. || — || align=right | 1.9 km || 
|-id=822 bgcolor=#E9E9E9
| 300822 ||  || — || November 30, 2007 || Lulin Observatory || T.-C. Yang, Q.-z. Ye || GEF || align=right | 2.1 km || 
|-id=823 bgcolor=#E9E9E9
| 300823 ||  || — || November 16, 2007 || Socorro || LINEAR || — || align=right | 2.3 km || 
|-id=824 bgcolor=#E9E9E9
| 300824 ||  || — || December 3, 2007 || 7300 Observatory || W. K. Y. Yeung || IAN || align=right | 1.1 km || 
|-id=825 bgcolor=#d6d6d6
| 300825 ||  || — || December 4, 2007 || Mount Lemmon || Mount Lemmon Survey || — || align=right | 3.5 km || 
|-id=826 bgcolor=#d6d6d6
| 300826 ||  || — || December 4, 2007 || Catalina || CSS || EOS || align=right | 2.8 km || 
|-id=827 bgcolor=#E9E9E9
| 300827 ||  || — || December 10, 2007 || Socorro || LINEAR || WIT || align=right | 1.4 km || 
|-id=828 bgcolor=#E9E9E9
| 300828 ||  || — || September 11, 2002 || Palomar || NEAT || — || align=right | 2.2 km || 
|-id=829 bgcolor=#E9E9E9
| 300829 ||  || — || December 12, 2007 || La Sagra || OAM Obs. || — || align=right | 1.9 km || 
|-id=830 bgcolor=#E9E9E9
| 300830 ||  || — || December 10, 2007 || Socorro || LINEAR || — || align=right | 2.3 km || 
|-id=831 bgcolor=#E9E9E9
| 300831 ||  || — || December 15, 2007 || Kanab || E. E. Sheridan || — || align=right | 2.6 km || 
|-id=832 bgcolor=#E9E9E9
| 300832 ||  || — || December 15, 2007 || Kitt Peak || Spacewatch || HOF || align=right | 3.1 km || 
|-id=833 bgcolor=#E9E9E9
| 300833 ||  || — || December 15, 2007 || Kitt Peak || Spacewatch || — || align=right | 1.9 km || 
|-id=834 bgcolor=#d6d6d6
| 300834 ||  || — || December 15, 2007 || Kitt Peak || Spacewatch || — || align=right | 4.4 km || 
|-id=835 bgcolor=#E9E9E9
| 300835 ||  || — || December 10, 2007 || Socorro || LINEAR || — || align=right | 3.6 km || 
|-id=836 bgcolor=#E9E9E9
| 300836 ||  || — || December 13, 2007 || Socorro || LINEAR || ADE || align=right | 2.3 km || 
|-id=837 bgcolor=#E9E9E9
| 300837 ||  || — || December 13, 2007 || Socorro || LINEAR || RAF || align=right | 1.4 km || 
|-id=838 bgcolor=#E9E9E9
| 300838 ||  || — || December 13, 2007 || Socorro || LINEAR || — || align=right | 3.8 km || 
|-id=839 bgcolor=#E9E9E9
| 300839 ||  || — || December 13, 2007 || Socorro || LINEAR || MRX || align=right | 1.3 km || 
|-id=840 bgcolor=#d6d6d6
| 300840 ||  || — || December 15, 2007 || Kitt Peak || Spacewatch || EOS || align=right | 2.3 km || 
|-id=841 bgcolor=#d6d6d6
| 300841 ||  || — || December 15, 2007 || Kitt Peak || Spacewatch || — || align=right | 3.5 km || 
|-id=842 bgcolor=#d6d6d6
| 300842 ||  || — || December 15, 2007 || Kitt Peak || Spacewatch || — || align=right | 4.5 km || 
|-id=843 bgcolor=#d6d6d6
| 300843 ||  || — || December 14, 2007 || Mount Lemmon || Mount Lemmon Survey || — || align=right | 2.5 km || 
|-id=844 bgcolor=#E9E9E9
| 300844 ||  || — || December 4, 2007 || Kitt Peak || Spacewatch || — || align=right | 2.9 km || 
|-id=845 bgcolor=#E9E9E9
| 300845 ||  || — || December 17, 2007 || Eskridge || G. Hug || — || align=right | 2.7 km || 
|-id=846 bgcolor=#d6d6d6
| 300846 ||  || — || December 16, 2007 || Mount Lemmon || Mount Lemmon Survey || VER || align=right | 3.9 km || 
|-id=847 bgcolor=#d6d6d6
| 300847 ||  || — || December 17, 2007 || Mount Lemmon || Mount Lemmon Survey || — || align=right | 3.0 km || 
|-id=848 bgcolor=#E9E9E9
| 300848 ||  || — || December 19, 2007 || Bisei SG Center || BATTeRS || — || align=right | 2.9 km || 
|-id=849 bgcolor=#d6d6d6
| 300849 ||  || — || December 16, 2007 || Kitt Peak || Spacewatch || — || align=right | 3.7 km || 
|-id=850 bgcolor=#d6d6d6
| 300850 ||  || — || December 3, 2007 || Kitt Peak || Spacewatch || — || align=right | 4.1 km || 
|-id=851 bgcolor=#E9E9E9
| 300851 ||  || — || December 18, 2007 || Mount Lemmon || Mount Lemmon Survey || — || align=right | 2.3 km || 
|-id=852 bgcolor=#E9E9E9
| 300852 ||  || — || December 28, 2007 || Kitt Peak || Spacewatch || AGN || align=right | 1.6 km || 
|-id=853 bgcolor=#E9E9E9
| 300853 ||  || — || December 28, 2007 || Kitt Peak || Spacewatch || AGN || align=right | 1.7 km || 
|-id=854 bgcolor=#d6d6d6
| 300854 Changyuin ||  ||  || December 28, 2007 || Lulin || H.-C. Lin, Q.-z. Ye || EOS || align=right | 2.6 km || 
|-id=855 bgcolor=#d6d6d6
| 300855 ||  || — || December 28, 2007 || Kitt Peak || Spacewatch || — || align=right | 2.6 km || 
|-id=856 bgcolor=#d6d6d6
| 300856 ||  || — || December 30, 2007 || Mount Lemmon || Mount Lemmon Survey || EOS || align=right | 2.7 km || 
|-id=857 bgcolor=#d6d6d6
| 300857 ||  || — || December 30, 2007 || Mount Lemmon || Mount Lemmon Survey || — || align=right | 3.9 km || 
|-id=858 bgcolor=#d6d6d6
| 300858 ||  || — || December 30, 2007 || Catalina || CSS || — || align=right | 4.4 km || 
|-id=859 bgcolor=#d6d6d6
| 300859 ||  || — || December 30, 2007 || Mount Lemmon || Mount Lemmon Survey || — || align=right | 3.7 km || 
|-id=860 bgcolor=#d6d6d6
| 300860 ||  || — || December 30, 2007 || Mount Lemmon || Mount Lemmon Survey || — || align=right | 3.2 km || 
|-id=861 bgcolor=#d6d6d6
| 300861 ||  || — || December 28, 2007 || Kitt Peak || Spacewatch || KAR || align=right | 1.4 km || 
|-id=862 bgcolor=#d6d6d6
| 300862 ||  || — || December 30, 2007 || Kitt Peak || Spacewatch || — || align=right | 3.8 km || 
|-id=863 bgcolor=#E9E9E9
| 300863 ||  || — || December 17, 2007 || Kitt Peak || Spacewatch || — || align=right | 2.2 km || 
|-id=864 bgcolor=#d6d6d6
| 300864 ||  || — || December 30, 2007 || Kitt Peak || Spacewatch || KOR || align=right | 1.6 km || 
|-id=865 bgcolor=#d6d6d6
| 300865 ||  || — || December 17, 2007 || Mount Lemmon || Mount Lemmon Survey || — || align=right | 4.4 km || 
|-id=866 bgcolor=#d6d6d6
| 300866 ||  || — || December 18, 2007 || Mount Lemmon || Mount Lemmon Survey || VER || align=right | 4.3 km || 
|-id=867 bgcolor=#E9E9E9
| 300867 ||  || — || January 4, 2008 || Purple Mountain || PMO NEO || DOR || align=right | 3.0 km || 
|-id=868 bgcolor=#d6d6d6
| 300868 ||  || — || January 10, 2008 || Mount Lemmon || Mount Lemmon Survey || — || align=right | 3.3 km || 
|-id=869 bgcolor=#d6d6d6
| 300869 ||  || — || January 10, 2008 || Mount Lemmon || Mount Lemmon Survey || — || align=right | 3.4 km || 
|-id=870 bgcolor=#d6d6d6
| 300870 ||  || — || January 10, 2008 || Mount Lemmon || Mount Lemmon Survey || — || align=right | 3.5 km || 
|-id=871 bgcolor=#d6d6d6
| 300871 ||  || — || January 10, 2008 || Mount Lemmon || Mount Lemmon Survey || — || align=right | 3.5 km || 
|-id=872 bgcolor=#E9E9E9
| 300872 ||  || — || January 5, 2008 || Bisei SG Center || BATTeRS || MRX || align=right | 1.3 km || 
|-id=873 bgcolor=#d6d6d6
| 300873 ||  || — || January 11, 2008 || Kitt Peak || Spacewatch || — || align=right | 2.7 km || 
|-id=874 bgcolor=#d6d6d6
| 300874 ||  || — || January 11, 2008 || Kitt Peak || Spacewatch || — || align=right | 2.6 km || 
|-id=875 bgcolor=#d6d6d6
| 300875 ||  || — || January 11, 2008 || Mount Lemmon || Mount Lemmon Survey || HYG || align=right | 2.8 km || 
|-id=876 bgcolor=#d6d6d6
| 300876 ||  || — || January 11, 2008 || Kitt Peak || Spacewatch || — || align=right | 2.9 km || 
|-id=877 bgcolor=#d6d6d6
| 300877 ||  || — || January 12, 2008 || Kitt Peak || Spacewatch || — || align=right | 6.2 km || 
|-id=878 bgcolor=#d6d6d6
| 300878 ||  || — || January 12, 2008 || Kitt Peak || Spacewatch || — || align=right | 3.4 km || 
|-id=879 bgcolor=#d6d6d6
| 300879 ||  || — || January 12, 2008 || Mount Lemmon || Mount Lemmon Survey || — || align=right | 5.1 km || 
|-id=880 bgcolor=#d6d6d6
| 300880 ||  || — || January 14, 2008 || Kitt Peak || Spacewatch || — || align=right | 4.3 km || 
|-id=881 bgcolor=#d6d6d6
| 300881 ||  || — || January 14, 2008 || Kitt Peak || Spacewatch || — || align=right | 3.5 km || 
|-id=882 bgcolor=#d6d6d6
| 300882 ||  || — || January 14, 2008 || Kitt Peak || Spacewatch || HYG || align=right | 3.3 km || 
|-id=883 bgcolor=#d6d6d6
| 300883 ||  || — || January 12, 2008 || Kitt Peak || Spacewatch || — || align=right | 2.4 km || 
|-id=884 bgcolor=#d6d6d6
| 300884 ||  || — || January 14, 2008 || Kitt Peak || Spacewatch || — || align=right | 3.6 km || 
|-id=885 bgcolor=#d6d6d6
| 300885 ||  || — || January 12, 2008 || Socorro || LINEAR || — || align=right | 4.4 km || 
|-id=886 bgcolor=#d6d6d6
| 300886 ||  || — || January 13, 2008 || Kitt Peak || Spacewatch || — || align=right | 2.9 km || 
|-id=887 bgcolor=#d6d6d6
| 300887 ||  || — || January 15, 2008 || Socorro || LINEAR || URS || align=right | 5.0 km || 
|-id=888 bgcolor=#d6d6d6
| 300888 ||  || — || January 1, 2008 || Mount Lemmon || Mount Lemmon Survey || EOS || align=right | 2.2 km || 
|-id=889 bgcolor=#d6d6d6
| 300889 ||  || — || January 16, 2008 || Mount Lemmon || Mount Lemmon Survey || EOS || align=right | 2.6 km || 
|-id=890 bgcolor=#d6d6d6
| 300890 ||  || — || January 18, 2008 || Kitt Peak || Spacewatch || — || align=right | 3.5 km || 
|-id=891 bgcolor=#d6d6d6
| 300891 ||  || — || January 19, 2008 || Kitt Peak || Spacewatch || — || align=right | 4.1 km || 
|-id=892 bgcolor=#d6d6d6
| 300892 Taichung ||  ||  || January 28, 2008 || Lulin Observatory || C.-S. Lin, Q.-z. Ye || THM || align=right | 2.6 km || 
|-id=893 bgcolor=#d6d6d6
| 300893 ||  || — || January 28, 2008 || La Sagra || OAM Obs. || EMA || align=right | 4.9 km || 
|-id=894 bgcolor=#d6d6d6
| 300894 ||  || — || January 30, 2008 || Mount Lemmon || Mount Lemmon Survey || MEL || align=right | 3.9 km || 
|-id=895 bgcolor=#d6d6d6
| 300895 ||  || — || January 31, 2008 || Catalina || CSS || EOS || align=right | 2.4 km || 
|-id=896 bgcolor=#d6d6d6
| 300896 ||  || — || January 30, 2008 || Catalina || CSS || URS || align=right | 4.3 km || 
|-id=897 bgcolor=#d6d6d6
| 300897 ||  || — || January 30, 2008 || La Sagra || OAM Obs. || ALA || align=right | 6.7 km || 
|-id=898 bgcolor=#d6d6d6
| 300898 ||  || — || January 30, 2008 || Eskridge || G. Hug || EOS || align=right | 2.5 km || 
|-id=899 bgcolor=#d6d6d6
| 300899 ||  || — || January 30, 2008 || Mount Lemmon || Mount Lemmon Survey || — || align=right | 3.5 km || 
|-id=900 bgcolor=#d6d6d6
| 300900 ||  || — || January 30, 2008 || Kitt Peak || Spacewatch || — || align=right | 2.8 km || 
|}

300901–301000 

|-bgcolor=#d6d6d6
| 300901 ||  || — || January 30, 2008 || Kitt Peak || Spacewatch || — || align=right | 4.0 km || 
|-id=902 bgcolor=#d6d6d6
| 300902 ||  || — || January 30, 2008 || Catalina || CSS || — || align=right | 3.2 km || 
|-id=903 bgcolor=#d6d6d6
| 300903 ||  || — || January 31, 2008 || Mount Lemmon || Mount Lemmon Survey || 7:4 || align=right | 4.7 km || 
|-id=904 bgcolor=#d6d6d6
| 300904 ||  || — || January 30, 2008 || Catalina || CSS || — || align=right | 4.2 km || 
|-id=905 bgcolor=#d6d6d6
| 300905 ||  || — || January 31, 2008 || La Sagra || OAM Obs. || — || align=right | 3.3 km || 
|-id=906 bgcolor=#d6d6d6
| 300906 ||  || — || January 30, 2008 || Catalina || CSS || — || align=right | 5.2 km || 
|-id=907 bgcolor=#d6d6d6
| 300907 ||  || — || January 31, 2008 || Catalina || CSS || — || align=right | 4.9 km || 
|-id=908 bgcolor=#d6d6d6
| 300908 ||  || — || January 30, 2008 || Catalina || CSS || — || align=right | 2.9 km || 
|-id=909 bgcolor=#d6d6d6
| 300909 Kenthompson ||  ||  || January 30, 2008 || Jarnac || T. Glinos, D. H. Levy || VER || align=right | 3.5 km || 
|-id=910 bgcolor=#d6d6d6
| 300910 ||  || — || January 17, 2008 || Mount Lemmon || Mount Lemmon Survey || — || align=right | 3.9 km || 
|-id=911 bgcolor=#d6d6d6
| 300911 ||  || — || January 17, 2008 || Kitt Peak || Spacewatch || — || align=right | 3.1 km || 
|-id=912 bgcolor=#d6d6d6
| 300912 ||  || — || January 17, 2008 || Kitt Peak || Spacewatch || EMA || align=right | 4.9 km || 
|-id=913 bgcolor=#E9E9E9
| 300913 ||  || — || February 1, 2008 || Vail-Jarnac || Jarnac Obs. || JUN || align=right | 1.3 km || 
|-id=914 bgcolor=#d6d6d6
| 300914 ||  || — || February 2, 2008 || Kitt Peak || Spacewatch || — || align=right | 3.5 km || 
|-id=915 bgcolor=#d6d6d6
| 300915 ||  || — || February 2, 2008 || Catalina || CSS || — || align=right | 3.5 km || 
|-id=916 bgcolor=#d6d6d6
| 300916 ||  || — || February 3, 2008 || Kitt Peak || Spacewatch || HYG || align=right | 2.8 km || 
|-id=917 bgcolor=#d6d6d6
| 300917 ||  || — || February 3, 2008 || Kitt Peak || Spacewatch || — || align=right | 2.9 km || 
|-id=918 bgcolor=#d6d6d6
| 300918 ||  || — || February 3, 2008 || Kitt Peak || Spacewatch || HYG || align=right | 3.0 km || 
|-id=919 bgcolor=#d6d6d6
| 300919 ||  || — || February 3, 2008 || Kitt Peak || Spacewatch || — || align=right | 2.4 km || 
|-id=920 bgcolor=#d6d6d6
| 300920 ||  || — || February 2, 2008 || Kitt Peak || Spacewatch || — || align=right | 3.5 km || 
|-id=921 bgcolor=#d6d6d6
| 300921 ||  || — || February 2, 2008 || Kitt Peak || Spacewatch || EOS || align=right | 4.7 km || 
|-id=922 bgcolor=#d6d6d6
| 300922 ||  || — || February 2, 2008 || Kitt Peak || Spacewatch || 7:4 || align=right | 3.9 km || 
|-id=923 bgcolor=#d6d6d6
| 300923 ||  || — || February 7, 2008 || Catalina || CSS || EOS || align=right | 2.6 km || 
|-id=924 bgcolor=#d6d6d6
| 300924 ||  || — || February 7, 2008 || Mount Lemmon || Mount Lemmon Survey || HYG || align=right | 2.5 km || 
|-id=925 bgcolor=#d6d6d6
| 300925 ||  || — || February 6, 2008 || Socorro || LINEAR || — || align=right | 4.5 km || 
|-id=926 bgcolor=#E9E9E9
| 300926 ||  || — || February 8, 2008 || Socorro || LINEAR || critical || align=right | 2.4 km || 
|-id=927 bgcolor=#E9E9E9
| 300927 ||  || — || February 3, 2008 || Catalina || CSS || DOR || align=right | 3.4 km || 
|-id=928 bgcolor=#d6d6d6
| 300928 Uderzo ||  ||  || February 9, 2008 || Saint-Sulpice || B. Christophe || — || align=right | 2.8 km || 
|-id=929 bgcolor=#d6d6d6
| 300929 ||  || — || February 6, 2008 || Catalina || CSS || URS || align=right | 4.6 km || 
|-id=930 bgcolor=#d6d6d6
| 300930 ||  || — || February 6, 2008 || Catalina || CSS || EOS || align=right | 2.5 km || 
|-id=931 bgcolor=#d6d6d6
| 300931 ||  || — || February 9, 2008 || Kitt Peak || Spacewatch || — || align=right | 3.4 km || 
|-id=932 bgcolor=#E9E9E9
| 300932 Kyslyuk ||  ||  || February 11, 2008 || Andrushivka || Andrushivka Obs. || — || align=right | 4.2 km || 
|-id=933 bgcolor=#d6d6d6
| 300933 Teresamarion ||  ||  || February 8, 2008 || Costitx || OAM Obs. || EOS || align=right | 2.7 km || 
|-id=934 bgcolor=#d6d6d6
| 300934 ||  || — || February 14, 2008 || Taunus || R. Kling, U. Zimmer || — || align=right | 3.6 km || 
|-id=935 bgcolor=#d6d6d6
| 300935 ||  || — || February 8, 2008 || Kitt Peak || Spacewatch || — || align=right | 5.3 km || 
|-id=936 bgcolor=#d6d6d6
| 300936 ||  || — || January 20, 2002 || Kitt Peak || Spacewatch || — || align=right | 5.0 km || 
|-id=937 bgcolor=#d6d6d6
| 300937 ||  || — || February 8, 2008 || Kitt Peak || Spacewatch || — || align=right | 2.5 km || 
|-id=938 bgcolor=#d6d6d6
| 300938 ||  || — || February 8, 2008 || Mount Lemmon || Mount Lemmon Survey || — || align=right | 3.0 km || 
|-id=939 bgcolor=#d6d6d6
| 300939 ||  || — || February 8, 2008 || Kitt Peak || Spacewatch || — || align=right | 3.1 km || 
|-id=940 bgcolor=#d6d6d6
| 300940 ||  || — || February 8, 2008 || Kitt Peak || Spacewatch || — || align=right | 2.9 km || 
|-id=941 bgcolor=#d6d6d6
| 300941 ||  || — || February 9, 2008 || Mount Lemmon || Mount Lemmon Survey || — || align=right | 4.1 km || 
|-id=942 bgcolor=#d6d6d6
| 300942 ||  || — || February 12, 2008 || Mount Lemmon || Mount Lemmon Survey || KAR || align=right | 1.4 km || 
|-id=943 bgcolor=#d6d6d6
| 300943 ||  || — || February 6, 2008 || Socorro || LINEAR || EOS || align=right | 2.5 km || 
|-id=944 bgcolor=#d6d6d6
| 300944 ||  || — || February 6, 2008 || Socorro || LINEAR || URS || align=right | 5.3 km || 
|-id=945 bgcolor=#d6d6d6
| 300945 ||  || — || February 3, 2008 || Kitt Peak || Spacewatch || — || align=right | 3.6 km || 
|-id=946 bgcolor=#d6d6d6
| 300946 ||  || — || February 6, 2008 || Catalina || CSS || — || align=right | 4.0 km || 
|-id=947 bgcolor=#d6d6d6
| 300947 ||  || — || February 13, 2008 || Catalina || CSS || EOS || align=right | 2.7 km || 
|-id=948 bgcolor=#d6d6d6
| 300948 ||  || — || February 10, 2008 || Siding Spring || SSS || EUP || align=right | 6.5 km || 
|-id=949 bgcolor=#d6d6d6
| 300949 ||  || — || February 1, 2008 || Kitt Peak || Spacewatch || — || align=right | 4.3 km || 
|-id=950 bgcolor=#d6d6d6
| 300950 ||  || — || February 2, 2008 || Kitt Peak || Spacewatch || — || align=right | 2.8 km || 
|-id=951 bgcolor=#d6d6d6
| 300951 ||  || — || February 2, 2008 || Kitt Peak || Spacewatch || HYG || align=right | 3.1 km || 
|-id=952 bgcolor=#d6d6d6
| 300952 ||  || — || February 12, 2008 || Mount Lemmon || Mount Lemmon Survey || HYG || align=right | 3.2 km || 
|-id=953 bgcolor=#d6d6d6
| 300953 ||  || — || February 12, 2008 || Kitt Peak || Spacewatch || HYG || align=right | 3.6 km || 
|-id=954 bgcolor=#d6d6d6
| 300954 ||  || — || February 10, 2008 || Socorro || LINEAR || — || align=right | 3.3 km || 
|-id=955 bgcolor=#d6d6d6
| 300955 ||  || — || February 24, 2008 || Mount Lemmon || Mount Lemmon Survey || — || align=right | 5.3 km || 
|-id=956 bgcolor=#d6d6d6
| 300956 ||  || — || February 24, 2008 || Kitt Peak || Spacewatch || — || align=right | 2.6 km || 
|-id=957 bgcolor=#d6d6d6
| 300957 ||  || — || February 26, 2008 || Kitt Peak || Spacewatch || EOS || align=right | 2.1 km || 
|-id=958 bgcolor=#d6d6d6
| 300958 ||  || — || February 26, 2008 || Kitt Peak || Spacewatch || — || align=right | 4.0 km || 
|-id=959 bgcolor=#d6d6d6
| 300959 ||  || — || February 27, 2008 || Mount Lemmon || Mount Lemmon Survey || 7:4 || align=right | 4.5 km || 
|-id=960 bgcolor=#d6d6d6
| 300960 ||  || — || February 26, 2008 || Mount Lemmon || Mount Lemmon Survey || — || align=right | 3.6 km || 
|-id=961 bgcolor=#d6d6d6
| 300961 ||  || — || February 27, 2008 || Catalina || CSS || VER || align=right | 4.0 km || 
|-id=962 bgcolor=#d6d6d6
| 300962 ||  || — || February 27, 2008 || Catalina || CSS || — || align=right | 5.1 km || 
|-id=963 bgcolor=#d6d6d6
| 300963 ||  || — || February 28, 2008 || Mount Lemmon || Mount Lemmon Survey || — || align=right | 3.9 km || 
|-id=964 bgcolor=#E9E9E9
| 300964 ||  || — || February 29, 2008 || Mount Lemmon || Mount Lemmon Survey || — || align=right | 4.3 km || 
|-id=965 bgcolor=#d6d6d6
| 300965 ||  || — || February 29, 2008 || Kitt Peak || Spacewatch || — || align=right | 3.2 km || 
|-id=966 bgcolor=#d6d6d6
| 300966 ||  || — || February 18, 2008 || Mount Lemmon || Mount Lemmon Survey || — || align=right | 3.4 km || 
|-id=967 bgcolor=#d6d6d6
| 300967 ||  || — || February 28, 2008 || Kitt Peak || Spacewatch || — || align=right | 2.9 km || 
|-id=968 bgcolor=#d6d6d6
| 300968 ||  || — || March 1, 2008 || Mount Lemmon || Mount Lemmon Survey || 7:4 || align=right | 5.6 km || 
|-id=969 bgcolor=#d6d6d6
| 300969 ||  || — || March 2, 2008 || Mount Lemmon || Mount Lemmon Survey || — || align=right | 3.4 km || 
|-id=970 bgcolor=#d6d6d6
| 300970 ||  || — || March 4, 2008 || Mount Lemmon || Mount Lemmon Survey || — || align=right | 4.6 km || 
|-id=971 bgcolor=#d6d6d6
| 300971 ||  || — || March 4, 2008 || Kitt Peak || Spacewatch || — || align=right | 5.4 km || 
|-id=972 bgcolor=#d6d6d6
| 300972 ||  || — || March 5, 2008 || Kitt Peak || Spacewatch || — || align=right | 6.5 km || 
|-id=973 bgcolor=#d6d6d6
| 300973 ||  || — || March 6, 2008 || Mount Lemmon || Mount Lemmon Survey || — || align=right | 5.3 km || 
|-id=974 bgcolor=#d6d6d6
| 300974 ||  || — || March 9, 2008 || Socorro || LINEAR || — || align=right | 4.3 km || 
|-id=975 bgcolor=#d6d6d6
| 300975 ||  || — || March 9, 2008 || Socorro || LINEAR || — || align=right | 3.8 km || 
|-id=976 bgcolor=#d6d6d6
| 300976 ||  || — || March 7, 2008 || Kitt Peak || Spacewatch || — || align=right | 4.0 km || 
|-id=977 bgcolor=#d6d6d6
| 300977 ||  || — || March 1, 2008 || Catalina || CSS || EUP || align=right | 4.0 km || 
|-id=978 bgcolor=#d6d6d6
| 300978 ||  || — || March 7, 2008 || Catalina || CSS || Tj (2.97) || align=right | 4.7 km || 
|-id=979 bgcolor=#d6d6d6
| 300979 ||  || — || March 5, 2008 || Mount Lemmon || Mount Lemmon Survey || — || align=right | 5.3 km || 
|-id=980 bgcolor=#d6d6d6
| 300980 ||  || — || March 7, 2008 || Catalina || CSS || — || align=right | 5.7 km || 
|-id=981 bgcolor=#d6d6d6
| 300981 ||  || — || March 11, 2008 || Kitt Peak || Spacewatch || — || align=right | 2.6 km || 
|-id=982 bgcolor=#d6d6d6
| 300982 ||  || — || April 4, 2003 || Kitt Peak || Spacewatch || — || align=right | 3.9 km || 
|-id=983 bgcolor=#d6d6d6
| 300983 ||  || — || March 11, 2008 || Mount Lemmon || Mount Lemmon Survey || — || align=right | 3.4 km || 
|-id=984 bgcolor=#d6d6d6
| 300984 ||  || — || March 14, 2008 || Catalina || CSS || HYG || align=right | 3.7 km || 
|-id=985 bgcolor=#d6d6d6
| 300985 ||  || — || March 25, 2008 || Kitt Peak || Spacewatch || — || align=right | 3.8 km || 
|-id=986 bgcolor=#d6d6d6
| 300986 ||  || — || March 25, 2008 || Kitt Peak || Spacewatch || HIL3:2 || align=right | 7.0 km || 
|-id=987 bgcolor=#d6d6d6
| 300987 ||  || — || March 26, 2008 || Kitt Peak || Spacewatch || — || align=right | 3.9 km || 
|-id=988 bgcolor=#d6d6d6
| 300988 ||  || — || March 26, 2008 || Mount Lemmon || Mount Lemmon Survey || HYG || align=right | 3.5 km || 
|-id=989 bgcolor=#d6d6d6
| 300989 ||  || — || March 27, 2008 || Kitt Peak || Spacewatch || HYG || align=right | 3.3 km || 
|-id=990 bgcolor=#d6d6d6
| 300990 ||  || — || March 28, 2008 || Mount Lemmon || Mount Lemmon Survey || — || align=right | 3.3 km || 
|-id=991 bgcolor=#C2FFFF
| 300991 ||  || — || March 28, 2008 || Kitt Peak || Spacewatch || L5 || align=right | 9.1 km || 
|-id=992 bgcolor=#d6d6d6
| 300992 ||  || — || March 25, 2008 || Kitt Peak || Spacewatch || — || align=right | 3.3 km || 
|-id=993 bgcolor=#C2FFFF
| 300993 ||  || — || March 31, 2008 || Kitt Peak || Spacewatch || L5 || align=right | 13 km || 
|-id=994 bgcolor=#d6d6d6
| 300994 ||  || — || March 30, 2008 || Kitt Peak || Spacewatch || HIL3:2 || align=right | 6.8 km || 
|-id=995 bgcolor=#d6d6d6
| 300995 ||  || — || April 8, 2008 || Mount Lemmon || Mount Lemmon Survey || — || align=right | 5.1 km || 
|-id=996 bgcolor=#d6d6d6
| 300996 ||  || — || April 7, 2008 || Wildberg || R. Apitzsch || — || align=right | 4.4 km || 
|-id=997 bgcolor=#d6d6d6
| 300997 ||  || — || April 1, 2008 || Mount Lemmon || Mount Lemmon Survey || — || align=right | 3.8 km || 
|-id=998 bgcolor=#d6d6d6
| 300998 ||  || — || April 3, 2008 || Mount Lemmon || Mount Lemmon Survey || — || align=right | 4.0 km || 
|-id=999 bgcolor=#C2FFFF
| 300999 ||  || — || March 12, 2007 || Kitt Peak || Spacewatch || L5 || align=right | 10 km || 
|-id=000 bgcolor=#C2FFFF
| 301000 ||  || — || April 6, 2008 || Kitt Peak || Spacewatch || L5 || align=right | 8.7 km || 
|}

References

External links 
 Discovery Circumstances: Numbered Minor Planets (300001)–(305000) (IAU Minor Planet Center)

0300